

60001–60100 

|-bgcolor=#d6d6d6
| 60001 Adélka ||  ||  || October 4, 1999 || Ondřejov || L. Kotková || THM || align=right | 5.7 km || 
|-id=002 bgcolor=#E9E9E9
| 60002 ||  || — || October 6, 1999 || High Point || D. K. Chesney || AGN || align=right | 4.8 km || 
|-id=003 bgcolor=#fefefe
| 60003 ||  || — || October 7, 1999 || Višnjan Observatory || K. Korlević, M. Jurić || — || align=right | 1.5 km || 
|-id=004 bgcolor=#d6d6d6
| 60004 ||  || — || October 10, 1999 || Oizumi || T. Kobayashi || THM || align=right | 7.5 km || 
|-id=005 bgcolor=#d6d6d6
| 60005 ||  || — || October 7, 1999 || Višnjan Observatory || K. Korlević, M. Jurić || HYG || align=right | 5.5 km || 
|-id=006 bgcolor=#d6d6d6
| 60006 Holgermandel ||  ||  || October 13, 1999 || Starkenburg Observatory || Starkenburg Obs. || TIR || align=right | 4.7 km || 
|-id=007 bgcolor=#d6d6d6
| 60007 ||  || — || October 13, 1999 || Ondřejov || P. Kušnirák, P. Pravec || THM || align=right | 7.0 km || 
|-id=008 bgcolor=#d6d6d6
| 60008 Jarda ||  ||  || October 14, 1999 || Ondřejov || L. Kotková || — || align=right | 4.3 km || 
|-id=009 bgcolor=#E9E9E9
| 60009 ||  || — || October 15, 1999 || Modra || A. Galád, J. Tóth || — || align=right | 2.4 km || 
|-id=010 bgcolor=#E9E9E9
| 60010 ||  || — || October 13, 1999 || Xinglong || SCAP || — || align=right | 5.7 km || 
|-id=011 bgcolor=#E9E9E9
| 60011 ||  || — || October 15, 1999 || Xinglong || SCAP || AGN || align=right | 2.9 km || 
|-id=012 bgcolor=#d6d6d6
| 60012 ||  || — || October 3, 1999 || Socorro || LINEAR || JLI || align=right | 7.0 km || 
|-id=013 bgcolor=#d6d6d6
| 60013 ||  || — || October 3, 1999 || Socorro || LINEAR || — || align=right | 6.4 km || 
|-id=014 bgcolor=#fefefe
| 60014 ||  || — || October 3, 1999 || Socorro || LINEAR || NYS || align=right | 2.3 km || 
|-id=015 bgcolor=#E9E9E9
| 60015 ||  || — || October 4, 1999 || Socorro || LINEAR || PAD || align=right | 7.2 km || 
|-id=016 bgcolor=#d6d6d6
| 60016 ||  || — || October 4, 1999 || Socorro || LINEAR || EOS || align=right | 5.4 km || 
|-id=017 bgcolor=#d6d6d6
| 60017 ||  || — || October 12, 1999 || Anderson Mesa || LONEOS || — || align=right | 8.9 km || 
|-id=018 bgcolor=#fefefe
| 60018 ||  || — || October 15, 1999 || Anderson Mesa || LONEOS || — || align=right | 2.2 km || 
|-id=019 bgcolor=#d6d6d6
| 60019 ||  || — || October 1, 1999 || Catalina || CSS || — || align=right | 8.8 km || 
|-id=020 bgcolor=#E9E9E9
| 60020 ||  || — || October 3, 1999 || Catalina || CSS || — || align=right | 5.5 km || 
|-id=021 bgcolor=#d6d6d6
| 60021 ||  || — || October 3, 1999 || Kitt Peak || Spacewatch || HYG || align=right | 5.2 km || 
|-id=022 bgcolor=#d6d6d6
| 60022 ||  || — || October 3, 1999 || Kitt Peak || Spacewatch || — || align=right | 6.8 km || 
|-id=023 bgcolor=#d6d6d6
| 60023 ||  || — || October 3, 1999 || Kitt Peak || Spacewatch || — || align=right | 6.9 km || 
|-id=024 bgcolor=#d6d6d6
| 60024 ||  || — || October 4, 1999 || Kitt Peak || Spacewatch || slow || align=right | 5.4 km || 
|-id=025 bgcolor=#d6d6d6
| 60025 ||  || — || October 6, 1999 || Kitt Peak || Spacewatch || THM || align=right | 5.0 km || 
|-id=026 bgcolor=#d6d6d6
| 60026 ||  || — || October 9, 1999 || Kitt Peak || Spacewatch || HYG || align=right | 7.3 km || 
|-id=027 bgcolor=#E9E9E9
| 60027 ||  || — || October 11, 1999 || Kitt Peak || Spacewatch || — || align=right | 1.6 km || 
|-id=028 bgcolor=#E9E9E9
| 60028 ||  || — || October 11, 1999 || Kitt Peak || Spacewatch || — || align=right | 3.4 km || 
|-id=029 bgcolor=#d6d6d6
| 60029 ||  || — || October 2, 1999 || Socorro || LINEAR || HYG || align=right | 7.8 km || 
|-id=030 bgcolor=#E9E9E9
| 60030 ||  || — || October 2, 1999 || Socorro || LINEAR || — || align=right | 5.0 km || 
|-id=031 bgcolor=#d6d6d6
| 60031 ||  || — || October 2, 1999 || Socorro || LINEAR || THM || align=right | 5.8 km || 
|-id=032 bgcolor=#E9E9E9
| 60032 ||  || — || October 2, 1999 || Socorro || LINEAR || — || align=right | 5.6 km || 
|-id=033 bgcolor=#fefefe
| 60033 ||  || — || October 2, 1999 || Socorro || LINEAR || — || align=right | 3.1 km || 
|-id=034 bgcolor=#fefefe
| 60034 ||  || — || October 2, 1999 || Socorro || LINEAR || FLO || align=right | 2.0 km || 
|-id=035 bgcolor=#E9E9E9
| 60035 ||  || — || October 2, 1999 || Socorro || LINEAR || — || align=right | 2.7 km || 
|-id=036 bgcolor=#d6d6d6
| 60036 ||  || — || October 2, 1999 || Socorro || LINEAR || HYG || align=right | 9.1 km || 
|-id=037 bgcolor=#fefefe
| 60037 ||  || — || October 2, 1999 || Socorro || LINEAR || — || align=right | 1.6 km || 
|-id=038 bgcolor=#d6d6d6
| 60038 ||  || — || October 2, 1999 || Socorro || LINEAR || — || align=right | 6.6 km || 
|-id=039 bgcolor=#fefefe
| 60039 ||  || — || October 2, 1999 || Socorro || LINEAR || — || align=right | 1.6 km || 
|-id=040 bgcolor=#E9E9E9
| 60040 ||  || — || October 2, 1999 || Socorro || LINEAR || WIT || align=right | 2.8 km || 
|-id=041 bgcolor=#d6d6d6
| 60041 ||  || — || October 2, 1999 || Socorro || LINEAR || — || align=right | 5.7 km || 
|-id=042 bgcolor=#d6d6d6
| 60042 ||  || — || October 2, 1999 || Socorro || LINEAR || ULA7:4 || align=right | 15 km || 
|-id=043 bgcolor=#d6d6d6
| 60043 ||  || — || October 2, 1999 || Socorro || LINEAR || THB || align=right | 5.2 km || 
|-id=044 bgcolor=#d6d6d6
| 60044 ||  || — || October 2, 1999 || Socorro || LINEAR || — || align=right | 8.9 km || 
|-id=045 bgcolor=#E9E9E9
| 60045 ||  || — || October 3, 1999 || Socorro || LINEAR || EUN || align=right | 3.2 km || 
|-id=046 bgcolor=#fefefe
| 60046 ||  || — || October 3, 1999 || Socorro || LINEAR || — || align=right | 1.4 km || 
|-id=047 bgcolor=#d6d6d6
| 60047 ||  || — || October 3, 1999 || Socorro || LINEAR || EOS || align=right | 4.9 km || 
|-id=048 bgcolor=#fefefe
| 60048 ||  || — || October 3, 1999 || Socorro || LINEAR || — || align=right | 3.6 km || 
|-id=049 bgcolor=#d6d6d6
| 60049 ||  || — || October 3, 1999 || Socorro || LINEAR || ALA || align=right | 11 km || 
|-id=050 bgcolor=#d6d6d6
| 60050 ||  || — || October 4, 1999 || Socorro || LINEAR || — || align=right | 7.2 km || 
|-id=051 bgcolor=#d6d6d6
| 60051 ||  || — || October 4, 1999 || Socorro || LINEAR || ALA || align=right | 9.0 km || 
|-id=052 bgcolor=#d6d6d6
| 60052 ||  || — || October 4, 1999 || Socorro || LINEAR || EOS || align=right | 6.7 km || 
|-id=053 bgcolor=#d6d6d6
| 60053 ||  || — || October 4, 1999 || Socorro || LINEAR || URS || align=right | 8.9 km || 
|-id=054 bgcolor=#fefefe
| 60054 ||  || — || October 4, 1999 || Socorro || LINEAR || FLO || align=right | 2.8 km || 
|-id=055 bgcolor=#E9E9E9
| 60055 ||  || — || October 4, 1999 || Socorro || LINEAR || HOF || align=right | 9.5 km || 
|-id=056 bgcolor=#d6d6d6
| 60056 ||  || — || October 4, 1999 || Socorro || LINEAR || — || align=right | 5.6 km || 
|-id=057 bgcolor=#d6d6d6
| 60057 ||  || — || October 4, 1999 || Socorro || LINEAR || — || align=right | 12 km || 
|-id=058 bgcolor=#E9E9E9
| 60058 ||  || — || October 4, 1999 || Socorro || LINEAR || HOF || align=right | 5.4 km || 
|-id=059 bgcolor=#fefefe
| 60059 ||  || — || October 4, 1999 || Socorro || LINEAR || FLO || align=right | 1.7 km || 
|-id=060 bgcolor=#E9E9E9
| 60060 ||  || — || October 4, 1999 || Socorro || LINEAR || PAD || align=right | 5.5 km || 
|-id=061 bgcolor=#fefefe
| 60061 ||  || — || October 4, 1999 || Socorro || LINEAR || — || align=right | 3.5 km || 
|-id=062 bgcolor=#d6d6d6
| 60062 ||  || — || October 4, 1999 || Socorro || LINEAR || THM || align=right | 6.6 km || 
|-id=063 bgcolor=#d6d6d6
| 60063 ||  || — || October 4, 1999 || Socorro || LINEAR || — || align=right | 6.5 km || 
|-id=064 bgcolor=#d6d6d6
| 60064 ||  || — || October 4, 1999 || Socorro || LINEAR || KOR || align=right | 3.1 km || 
|-id=065 bgcolor=#d6d6d6
| 60065 ||  || — || October 4, 1999 || Socorro || LINEAR || MEL || align=right | 9.8 km || 
|-id=066 bgcolor=#d6d6d6
| 60066 ||  || — || October 4, 1999 || Socorro || LINEAR || THM || align=right | 5.1 km || 
|-id=067 bgcolor=#d6d6d6
| 60067 ||  || — || October 4, 1999 || Socorro || LINEAR || — || align=right | 5.9 km || 
|-id=068 bgcolor=#d6d6d6
| 60068 ||  || — || October 4, 1999 || Socorro || LINEAR || THM || align=right | 6.9 km || 
|-id=069 bgcolor=#d6d6d6
| 60069 ||  || — || October 6, 1999 || Socorro || LINEAR || — || align=right | 5.2 km || 
|-id=070 bgcolor=#fefefe
| 60070 ||  || — || October 6, 1999 || Socorro || LINEAR || NYS || align=right | 1.1 km || 
|-id=071 bgcolor=#d6d6d6
| 60071 ||  || — || October 6, 1999 || Socorro || LINEAR || KOR || align=right | 2.4 km || 
|-id=072 bgcolor=#fefefe
| 60072 ||  || — || October 6, 1999 || Socorro || LINEAR || NYS || align=right | 2.1 km || 
|-id=073 bgcolor=#d6d6d6
| 60073 ||  || — || October 6, 1999 || Socorro || LINEAR || — || align=right | 5.5 km || 
|-id=074 bgcolor=#E9E9E9
| 60074 ||  || — || October 6, 1999 || Socorro || LINEAR || — || align=right | 1.9 km || 
|-id=075 bgcolor=#d6d6d6
| 60075 ||  || — || October 7, 1999 || Socorro || LINEAR || — || align=right | 5.2 km || 
|-id=076 bgcolor=#fefefe
| 60076 ||  || — || October 7, 1999 || Socorro || LINEAR || NYS || align=right | 2.6 km || 
|-id=077 bgcolor=#d6d6d6
| 60077 ||  || — || October 7, 1999 || Socorro || LINEAR || — || align=right | 5.7 km || 
|-id=078 bgcolor=#d6d6d6
| 60078 ||  || — || October 7, 1999 || Socorro || LINEAR || EOS || align=right | 4.3 km || 
|-id=079 bgcolor=#d6d6d6
| 60079 ||  || — || October 7, 1999 || Socorro || LINEAR || EOS || align=right | 4.9 km || 
|-id=080 bgcolor=#d6d6d6
| 60080 ||  || — || October 7, 1999 || Socorro || LINEAR || — || align=right | 8.6 km || 
|-id=081 bgcolor=#E9E9E9
| 60081 ||  || — || October 7, 1999 || Socorro || LINEAR || — || align=right | 4.5 km || 
|-id=082 bgcolor=#E9E9E9
| 60082 ||  || — || October 7, 1999 || Socorro || LINEAR || AGN || align=right | 3.4 km || 
|-id=083 bgcolor=#d6d6d6
| 60083 ||  || — || October 7, 1999 || Socorro || LINEAR || — || align=right | 7.1 km || 
|-id=084 bgcolor=#E9E9E9
| 60084 ||  || — || October 7, 1999 || Socorro || LINEAR || — || align=right | 3.2 km || 
|-id=085 bgcolor=#d6d6d6
| 60085 ||  || — || October 7, 1999 || Socorro || LINEAR || — || align=right | 6.5 km || 
|-id=086 bgcolor=#fefefe
| 60086 ||  || — || October 7, 1999 || Socorro || LINEAR || V || align=right | 1.8 km || 
|-id=087 bgcolor=#d6d6d6
| 60087 ||  || — || October 7, 1999 || Socorro || LINEAR || EOS || align=right | 3.8 km || 
|-id=088 bgcolor=#d6d6d6
| 60088 ||  || — || October 7, 1999 || Socorro || LINEAR || — || align=right | 7.3 km || 
|-id=089 bgcolor=#d6d6d6
| 60089 ||  || — || October 7, 1999 || Socorro || LINEAR || — || align=right | 2.7 km || 
|-id=090 bgcolor=#fefefe
| 60090 ||  || — || October 7, 1999 || Socorro || LINEAR || FLO || align=right | 1.4 km || 
|-id=091 bgcolor=#E9E9E9
| 60091 ||  || — || October 7, 1999 || Socorro || LINEAR || — || align=right | 3.6 km || 
|-id=092 bgcolor=#d6d6d6
| 60092 ||  || — || October 9, 1999 || Socorro || LINEAR || — || align=right | 7.6 km || 
|-id=093 bgcolor=#d6d6d6
| 60093 ||  || — || October 9, 1999 || Socorro || LINEAR || — || align=right | 7.3 km || 
|-id=094 bgcolor=#d6d6d6
| 60094 ||  || — || October 9, 1999 || Socorro || LINEAR || KOR || align=right | 3.7 km || 
|-id=095 bgcolor=#d6d6d6
| 60095 ||  || — || October 9, 1999 || Socorro || LINEAR || — || align=right | 7.4 km || 
|-id=096 bgcolor=#fefefe
| 60096 ||  || — || October 10, 1999 || Socorro || LINEAR || — || align=right | 2.2 km || 
|-id=097 bgcolor=#fefefe
| 60097 ||  || — || October 10, 1999 || Socorro || LINEAR || — || align=right | 2.4 km || 
|-id=098 bgcolor=#d6d6d6
| 60098 ||  || — || October 10, 1999 || Socorro || LINEAR || — || align=right | 5.6 km || 
|-id=099 bgcolor=#E9E9E9
| 60099 ||  || — || October 10, 1999 || Socorro || LINEAR || HEN || align=right | 3.7 km || 
|-id=100 bgcolor=#E9E9E9
| 60100 ||  || — || October 10, 1999 || Socorro || LINEAR || — || align=right | 5.2 km || 
|}

60101–60200 

|-bgcolor=#d6d6d6
| 60101 ||  || — || October 10, 1999 || Socorro || LINEAR || — || align=right | 5.7 km || 
|-id=102 bgcolor=#fefefe
| 60102 ||  || — || October 11, 1999 || Socorro || LINEAR || — || align=right | 1.9 km || 
|-id=103 bgcolor=#d6d6d6
| 60103 ||  || — || October 12, 1999 || Socorro || LINEAR || — || align=right | 12 km || 
|-id=104 bgcolor=#d6d6d6
| 60104 ||  || — || October 12, 1999 || Socorro || LINEAR || — || align=right | 6.1 km || 
|-id=105 bgcolor=#fefefe
| 60105 ||  || — || October 12, 1999 || Socorro || LINEAR || — || align=right | 2.1 km || 
|-id=106 bgcolor=#E9E9E9
| 60106 ||  || — || October 13, 1999 || Socorro || LINEAR || — || align=right | 5.5 km || 
|-id=107 bgcolor=#d6d6d6
| 60107 ||  || — || October 13, 1999 || Socorro || LINEAR || 7:4 || align=right | 9.4 km || 
|-id=108 bgcolor=#d6d6d6
| 60108 ||  || — || October 13, 1999 || Socorro || LINEAR || EOS || align=right | 4.1 km || 
|-id=109 bgcolor=#d6d6d6
| 60109 ||  || — || October 15, 1999 || Socorro || LINEAR || HYG || align=right | 7.0 km || 
|-id=110 bgcolor=#E9E9E9
| 60110 ||  || — || October 15, 1999 || Socorro || LINEAR || — || align=right | 4.4 km || 
|-id=111 bgcolor=#d6d6d6
| 60111 ||  || — || October 15, 1999 || Socorro || LINEAR || EOS || align=right | 4.6 km || 
|-id=112 bgcolor=#fefefe
| 60112 ||  || — || October 15, 1999 || Socorro || LINEAR || — || align=right | 1.2 km || 
|-id=113 bgcolor=#E9E9E9
| 60113 ||  || — || October 15, 1999 || Socorro || LINEAR || — || align=right | 3.9 km || 
|-id=114 bgcolor=#d6d6d6
| 60114 ||  || — || October 2, 1999 || Anderson Mesa || LONEOS || — || align=right | 3.9 km || 
|-id=115 bgcolor=#d6d6d6
| 60115 ||  || — || October 2, 1999 || Catalina || CSS || EOS || align=right | 5.1 km || 
|-id=116 bgcolor=#d6d6d6
| 60116 ||  || — || October 2, 1999 || Socorro || LINEAR || EOS || align=right | 6.4 km || 
|-id=117 bgcolor=#d6d6d6
| 60117 ||  || — || October 3, 1999 || Catalina || CSS || — || align=right | 6.5 km || 
|-id=118 bgcolor=#fefefe
| 60118 ||  || — || October 2, 1999 || Socorro || LINEAR || — || align=right | 1.5 km || 
|-id=119 bgcolor=#E9E9E9
| 60119 ||  || — || October 2, 1999 || Socorro || LINEAR || JUN || align=right | 2.5 km || 
|-id=120 bgcolor=#d6d6d6
| 60120 ||  || — || October 1, 1999 || Kitt Peak || Spacewatch || — || align=right | 5.2 km || 
|-id=121 bgcolor=#fefefe
| 60121 ||  || — || October 3, 1999 || Catalina || CSS || NYS || align=right | 5.0 km || 
|-id=122 bgcolor=#d6d6d6
| 60122 ||  || — || October 4, 1999 || Catalina || CSS || EOS || align=right | 5.8 km || 
|-id=123 bgcolor=#d6d6d6
| 60123 ||  || — || October 4, 1999 || Catalina || CSS || HYG || align=right | 8.7 km || 
|-id=124 bgcolor=#d6d6d6
| 60124 ||  || — || October 5, 1999 || Anderson Mesa || LONEOS || — || align=right | 6.5 km || 
|-id=125 bgcolor=#d6d6d6
| 60125 ||  || — || October 6, 1999 || Socorro || LINEAR || — || align=right | 4.7 km || 
|-id=126 bgcolor=#E9E9E9
| 60126 ||  || — || October 7, 1999 || Kitt Peak || Spacewatch || — || align=right | 4.6 km || 
|-id=127 bgcolor=#d6d6d6
| 60127 ||  || — || October 8, 1999 || Socorro || LINEAR || — || align=right | 13 km || 
|-id=128 bgcolor=#d6d6d6
| 60128 ||  || — || October 8, 1999 || Socorro || LINEAR || — || align=right | 10 km || 
|-id=129 bgcolor=#d6d6d6
| 60129 ||  || — || October 9, 1999 || Socorro || LINEAR || — || align=right | 4.4 km || 
|-id=130 bgcolor=#d6d6d6
| 60130 ||  || — || October 9, 1999 || Socorro || LINEAR || — || align=right | 5.0 km || 
|-id=131 bgcolor=#d6d6d6
| 60131 ||  || — || October 9, 1999 || Socorro || LINEAR || — || align=right | 6.9 km || 
|-id=132 bgcolor=#d6d6d6
| 60132 ||  || — || October 9, 1999 || Socorro || LINEAR || THM || align=right | 7.1 km || 
|-id=133 bgcolor=#E9E9E9
| 60133 ||  || — || October 3, 1999 || Socorro || LINEAR || MAR || align=right | 2.7 km || 
|-id=134 bgcolor=#d6d6d6
| 60134 ||  || — || October 3, 1999 || Socorro || LINEAR || — || align=right | 6.4 km || 
|-id=135 bgcolor=#d6d6d6
| 60135 ||  || — || October 7, 1999 || Socorro || LINEAR || THM || align=right | 8.2 km || 
|-id=136 bgcolor=#d6d6d6
| 60136 ||  || — || October 7, 1999 || Socorro || LINEAR || THM || align=right | 9.7 km || 
|-id=137 bgcolor=#d6d6d6
| 60137 ||  || — || October 7, 1999 || Socorro || LINEAR || THM || align=right | 7.1 km || 
|-id=138 bgcolor=#fefefe
| 60138 ||  || — || October 8, 1999 || Socorro || LINEAR || NYS || align=right | 1.6 km || 
|-id=139 bgcolor=#fefefe
| 60139 ||  || — || October 9, 1999 || Socorro || LINEAR || — || align=right | 1.3 km || 
|-id=140 bgcolor=#d6d6d6
| 60140 ||  || — || October 10, 1999 || Socorro || LINEAR || — || align=right | 5.8 km || 
|-id=141 bgcolor=#d6d6d6
| 60141 ||  || — || October 10, 1999 || Socorro || LINEAR || TIR || align=right | 7.7 km || 
|-id=142 bgcolor=#d6d6d6
| 60142 ||  || — || October 10, 1999 || Socorro || LINEAR || VER || align=right | 9.8 km || 
|-id=143 bgcolor=#d6d6d6
| 60143 ||  || — || October 12, 1999 || Socorro || LINEAR || — || align=right | 6.9 km || 
|-id=144 bgcolor=#E9E9E9
| 60144 ||  || — || October 12, 1999 || Socorro || LINEAR || KON || align=right | 5.9 km || 
|-id=145 bgcolor=#fefefe
| 60145 ||  || — || October 8, 1999 || Kitt Peak || Spacewatch || — || align=right | 1.2 km || 
|-id=146 bgcolor=#E9E9E9
| 60146 ||  || — || October 10, 1999 || Socorro || LINEAR || — || align=right | 2.2 km || 
|-id=147 bgcolor=#d6d6d6
| 60147 ||  || — || October 10, 1999 || Socorro || LINEAR || — || align=right | 6.4 km || 
|-id=148 bgcolor=#d6d6d6
| 60148 Seanurban ||  ||  || October 16, 1999 || Ondřejov || P. Kušnirák, P. Pravec || KOR || align=right | 2.9 km || 
|-id=149 bgcolor=#d6d6d6
| 60149 ||  || — || October 16, 1999 || Višnjan Observatory || K. Korlević || KOR || align=right | 3.6 km || 
|-id=150 bgcolor=#fefefe
| 60150 Zacharias ||  ||  || October 19, 1999 || Ondřejov || P. Pravec, P. Kušnirák || — || align=right | 1.4 km || 
|-id=151 bgcolor=#fefefe
| 60151 ||  || — || October 29, 1999 || Kitt Peak || Spacewatch || DAT || align=right | 1.6 km || 
|-id=152 bgcolor=#d6d6d6
| 60152 ||  || — || October 29, 1999 || Catalina || CSS || EOS || align=right | 6.6 km || 
|-id=153 bgcolor=#d6d6d6
| 60153 ||  || — || October 29, 1999 || Catalina || CSS || HYG || align=right | 9.6 km || 
|-id=154 bgcolor=#fefefe
| 60154 ||  || — || October 29, 1999 || Catalina || CSS || NYS || align=right | 1.3 km || 
|-id=155 bgcolor=#d6d6d6
| 60155 ||  || — || October 29, 1999 || Kitt Peak || Spacewatch || — || align=right | 7.0 km || 
|-id=156 bgcolor=#E9E9E9
| 60156 ||  || — || October 30, 1999 || Kitt Peak || Spacewatch || HEN || align=right | 2.6 km || 
|-id=157 bgcolor=#d6d6d6
| 60157 ||  || — || October 28, 1999 || Catalina || CSS || TIR || align=right | 5.2 km || 
|-id=158 bgcolor=#d6d6d6
| 60158 ||  || — || October 28, 1999 || Catalina || CSS || — || align=right | 10 km || 
|-id=159 bgcolor=#E9E9E9
| 60159 ||  || — || October 28, 1999 || Catalina || CSS || — || align=right | 4.3 km || 
|-id=160 bgcolor=#E9E9E9
| 60160 ||  || — || October 29, 1999 || Catalina || CSS || — || align=right | 4.1 km || 
|-id=161 bgcolor=#fefefe
| 60161 ||  || — || October 30, 1999 || Catalina || CSS || FLO || align=right | 1.3 km || 
|-id=162 bgcolor=#d6d6d6
| 60162 ||  || — || October 30, 1999 || Catalina || CSS || — || align=right | 7.9 km || 
|-id=163 bgcolor=#d6d6d6
| 60163 ||  || — || October 30, 1999 || Kitt Peak || Spacewatch || HYG || align=right | 5.9 km || 
|-id=164 bgcolor=#d6d6d6
| 60164 ||  || — || October 30, 1999 || Kitt Peak || Spacewatch || KOR || align=right | 2.9 km || 
|-id=165 bgcolor=#d6d6d6
| 60165 ||  || — || October 31, 1999 || Kitt Peak || Spacewatch || — || align=right | 7.3 km || 
|-id=166 bgcolor=#d6d6d6
| 60166 ||  || — || October 31, 1999 || Kitt Peak || Spacewatch || THM || align=right | 5.4 km || 
|-id=167 bgcolor=#E9E9E9
| 60167 ||  || — || October 31, 1999 || Kitt Peak || Spacewatch || — || align=right | 7.5 km || 
|-id=168 bgcolor=#E9E9E9
| 60168 ||  || — || October 19, 1999 || Socorro || LINEAR || WIT || align=right | 2.7 km || 
|-id=169 bgcolor=#fefefe
| 60169 ||  || — || October 29, 1999 || Catalina || CSS || V || align=right | 2.0 km || 
|-id=170 bgcolor=#fefefe
| 60170 ||  || — || October 31, 1999 || Catalina || CSS || — || align=right | 2.3 km || 
|-id=171 bgcolor=#d6d6d6
| 60171 ||  || — || October 30, 1999 || Catalina || CSS || TEL || align=right | 4.2 km || 
|-id=172 bgcolor=#d6d6d6
| 60172 ||  || — || October 31, 1999 || Catalina || CSS || URS || align=right | 7.5 km || 
|-id=173 bgcolor=#E9E9E9
| 60173 ||  || — || October 30, 1999 || Catalina || CSS || — || align=right | 5.9 km || 
|-id=174 bgcolor=#d6d6d6
| 60174 ||  || — || October 29, 1999 || Catalina || CSS || THM || align=right | 6.4 km || 
|-id=175 bgcolor=#d6d6d6
| 60175 ||  || — || November 3, 1999 || Starkenburg Observatory || Starkenburg Obs. || — || align=right | 8.2 km || 
|-id=176 bgcolor=#fefefe
| 60176 ||  || — || November 5, 1999 || Oizumi || T. Kobayashi || — || align=right | 1.7 km || 
|-id=177 bgcolor=#fefefe
| 60177 ||  || — || November 8, 1999 || Baton Rouge || W. R. Cooney Jr. || — || align=right | 2.9 km || 
|-id=178 bgcolor=#E9E9E9
| 60178 ||  || — || November 8, 1999 || Fountain Hills || C. W. Juels || — || align=right | 2.7 km || 
|-id=179 bgcolor=#d6d6d6
| 60179 ||  || — || November 7, 1999 || Višnjan Observatory || K. Korlević || — || align=right | 6.7 km || 
|-id=180 bgcolor=#d6d6d6
| 60180 ||  || — || November 8, 1999 || Višnjan Observatory || K. Korlević || THM || align=right | 4.7 km || 
|-id=181 bgcolor=#d6d6d6
| 60181 ||  || — || November 9, 1999 || Fountain Hills || C. W. Juels || TIR || align=right | 4.9 km || 
|-id=182 bgcolor=#fefefe
| 60182 ||  || — || November 9, 1999 || Oizumi || T. Kobayashi || V || align=right | 3.4 km || 
|-id=183 bgcolor=#d6d6d6
| 60183 Falcone ||  ||  || November 5, 1999 || Monte Agliale || M. M. M. Santangelo || KOR || align=right | 3.2 km || 
|-id=184 bgcolor=#E9E9E9
| 60184 ||  || — || November 2, 1999 || Kitt Peak || Spacewatch || — || align=right | 2.5 km || 
|-id=185 bgcolor=#fefefe
| 60185 ||  || — || November 12, 1999 || Višnjan Observatory || K. Korlević || — || align=right | 2.0 km || 
|-id=186 bgcolor=#d6d6d6
| 60186 Las Cruces ||  ||  || November 13, 1999 || Jornada || D. S. Dixon, J. Stevens || MEL || align=right | 13 km || 
|-id=187 bgcolor=#FA8072
| 60187 ||  || — || November 14, 1999 || Fountain Hills || C. W. Juels || PHO || align=right | 2.9 km || 
|-id=188 bgcolor=#fefefe
| 60188 ||  || — || November 13, 1999 || Oizumi || T. Kobayashi || NYS || align=right | 2.3 km || 
|-id=189 bgcolor=#d6d6d6
| 60189 ||  || — || November 3, 1999 || Catalina || CSS || — || align=right | 10 km || 
|-id=190 bgcolor=#d6d6d6
| 60190 ||  || — || November 3, 1999 || Socorro || LINEAR || — || align=right | 9.6 km || 
|-id=191 bgcolor=#fefefe
| 60191 ||  || — || November 3, 1999 || Socorro || LINEAR || — || align=right | 2.4 km || 
|-id=192 bgcolor=#fefefe
| 60192 ||  || — || November 4, 1999 || Kitt Peak || Spacewatch || — || align=right | 1.7 km || 
|-id=193 bgcolor=#fefefe
| 60193 ||  || — || November 1, 1999 || Catalina || CSS || FLO || align=right | 1.9 km || 
|-id=194 bgcolor=#d6d6d6
| 60194 ||  || — || November 1, 1999 || Catalina || CSS || — || align=right | 5.4 km || 
|-id=195 bgcolor=#E9E9E9
| 60195 ||  || — || November 3, 1999 || Catalina || CSS || PAD || align=right | 5.9 km || 
|-id=196 bgcolor=#E9E9E9
| 60196 ||  || — || November 3, 1999 || Socorro || LINEAR || HOF || align=right | 6.4 km || 
|-id=197 bgcolor=#E9E9E9
| 60197 ||  || — || November 3, 1999 || Socorro || LINEAR || — || align=right | 3.5 km || 
|-id=198 bgcolor=#E9E9E9
| 60198 ||  || — || November 4, 1999 || Socorro || LINEAR || — || align=right | 5.3 km || 
|-id=199 bgcolor=#fefefe
| 60199 ||  || — || November 4, 1999 || Socorro || LINEAR || MAS || align=right | 1.7 km || 
|-id=200 bgcolor=#d6d6d6
| 60200 ||  || — || November 4, 1999 || Socorro || LINEAR || — || align=right | 5.5 km || 
|}

60201–60300 

|-bgcolor=#E9E9E9
| 60201 ||  || — || November 4, 1999 || Socorro || LINEAR || AGN || align=right | 3.3 km || 
|-id=202 bgcolor=#d6d6d6
| 60202 ||  || — || November 4, 1999 || Socorro || LINEAR || — || align=right | 9.6 km || 
|-id=203 bgcolor=#fefefe
| 60203 ||  || — || November 4, 1999 || Socorro || LINEAR || — || align=right | 1.4 km || 
|-id=204 bgcolor=#d6d6d6
| 60204 ||  || — || November 4, 1999 || Socorro || LINEAR || KOR || align=right | 5.8 km || 
|-id=205 bgcolor=#d6d6d6
| 60205 ||  || — || November 4, 1999 || Socorro || LINEAR || HYG || align=right | 4.9 km || 
|-id=206 bgcolor=#fefefe
| 60206 ||  || — || November 4, 1999 || Socorro || LINEAR || — || align=right | 1.5 km || 
|-id=207 bgcolor=#d6d6d6
| 60207 ||  || — || November 4, 1999 || Socorro || LINEAR || KOR || align=right | 3.4 km || 
|-id=208 bgcolor=#d6d6d6
| 60208 ||  || — || November 15, 1999 || Ondřejov || P. Pravec || HYG || align=right | 8.8 km || 
|-id=209 bgcolor=#E9E9E9
| 60209 ||  || — || November 5, 1999 || Kitt Peak || Spacewatch || — || align=right | 1.9 km || 
|-id=210 bgcolor=#fefefe
| 60210 ||  || — || November 5, 1999 || Kitt Peak || Spacewatch || NYS || align=right | 1.7 km || 
|-id=211 bgcolor=#fefefe
| 60211 ||  || — || November 3, 1999 || Socorro || LINEAR || — || align=right | 1.7 km || 
|-id=212 bgcolor=#d6d6d6
| 60212 ||  || — || November 4, 1999 || Socorro || LINEAR || — || align=right | 11 km || 
|-id=213 bgcolor=#fefefe
| 60213 ||  || — || November 4, 1999 || Socorro || LINEAR || V || align=right | 1.6 km || 
|-id=214 bgcolor=#d6d6d6
| 60214 ||  || — || November 5, 1999 || Socorro || LINEAR || — || align=right | 6.9 km || 
|-id=215 bgcolor=#fefefe
| 60215 ||  || — || November 5, 1999 || Socorro || LINEAR || — || align=right | 2.6 km || 
|-id=216 bgcolor=#FA8072
| 60216 ||  || — || November 5, 1999 || Socorro || LINEAR || — || align=right | 1.5 km || 
|-id=217 bgcolor=#fefefe
| 60217 ||  || — || November 4, 1999 || Socorro || LINEAR || — || align=right | 2.0 km || 
|-id=218 bgcolor=#d6d6d6
| 60218 ||  || — || November 9, 1999 || Socorro || LINEAR || — || align=right | 7.7 km || 
|-id=219 bgcolor=#d6d6d6
| 60219 ||  || — || November 9, 1999 || Socorro || LINEAR || — || align=right | 4.9 km || 
|-id=220 bgcolor=#E9E9E9
| 60220 ||  || — || November 9, 1999 || Socorro || LINEAR || — || align=right | 1.8 km || 
|-id=221 bgcolor=#E9E9E9
| 60221 ||  || — || November 9, 1999 || Socorro || LINEAR || — || align=right | 4.7 km || 
|-id=222 bgcolor=#d6d6d6
| 60222 ||  || — || November 9, 1999 || Catalina || CSS || EOS || align=right | 6.7 km || 
|-id=223 bgcolor=#d6d6d6
| 60223 ||  || — || November 9, 1999 || Kitt Peak || Spacewatch || KOR || align=right | 2.9 km || 
|-id=224 bgcolor=#E9E9E9
| 60224 ||  || — || November 9, 1999 || Kitt Peak || Spacewatch || — || align=right | 2.1 km || 
|-id=225 bgcolor=#fefefe
| 60225 ||  || — || November 4, 1999 || Kitt Peak || Spacewatch || — || align=right | 1.3 km || 
|-id=226 bgcolor=#E9E9E9
| 60226 ||  || — || November 9, 1999 || Kitt Peak || Spacewatch || — || align=right | 4.0 km || 
|-id=227 bgcolor=#d6d6d6
| 60227 ||  || — || November 10, 1999 || Kitt Peak || Spacewatch || — || align=right | 4.2 km || 
|-id=228 bgcolor=#d6d6d6
| 60228 ||  || — || November 9, 1999 || Socorro || LINEAR || EOS || align=right | 4.6 km || 
|-id=229 bgcolor=#fefefe
| 60229 ||  || — || November 12, 1999 || Socorro || LINEAR || — || align=right | 1.5 km || 
|-id=230 bgcolor=#E9E9E9
| 60230 ||  || — || November 12, 1999 || Socorro || LINEAR || — || align=right | 4.4 km || 
|-id=231 bgcolor=#d6d6d6
| 60231 ||  || — || November 14, 1999 || Socorro || LINEAR || — || align=right | 2.6 km || 
|-id=232 bgcolor=#d6d6d6
| 60232 ||  || — || November 14, 1999 || Socorro || LINEAR || HIL3:2 || align=right | 12 km || 
|-id=233 bgcolor=#E9E9E9
| 60233 ||  || — || November 13, 1999 || Catalina || CSS || — || align=right | 7.0 km || 
|-id=234 bgcolor=#fefefe
| 60234 ||  || — || November 14, 1999 || Socorro || LINEAR || H || align=right | 1.5 km || 
|-id=235 bgcolor=#d6d6d6
| 60235 ||  || — || November 14, 1999 || Socorro || LINEAR || SYL7:4 || align=right | 12 km || 
|-id=236 bgcolor=#d6d6d6
| 60236 ||  || — || November 14, 1999 || Socorro || LINEAR || — || align=right | 5.0 km || 
|-id=237 bgcolor=#fefefe
| 60237 ||  || — || November 14, 1999 || Socorro || LINEAR || — || align=right | 1.8 km || 
|-id=238 bgcolor=#E9E9E9
| 60238 ||  || — || November 1, 1999 || Kitt Peak || Spacewatch || — || align=right | 1.8 km || 
|-id=239 bgcolor=#fefefe
| 60239 ||  || — || November 2, 1999 || Catalina || CSS || — || align=right | 1.8 km || 
|-id=240 bgcolor=#E9E9E9
| 60240 ||  || — || November 6, 1999 || Socorro || LINEAR || — || align=right | 5.5 km || 
|-id=241 bgcolor=#fefefe
| 60241 ||  || — || November 6, 1999 || Socorro || LINEAR || — || align=right | 2.1 km || 
|-id=242 bgcolor=#E9E9E9
| 60242 ||  || — || November 15, 1999 || Socorro || LINEAR || — || align=right | 4.3 km || 
|-id=243 bgcolor=#E9E9E9
| 60243 ||  || — || November 15, 1999 || Socorro || LINEAR || — || align=right | 3.6 km || 
|-id=244 bgcolor=#fefefe
| 60244 ||  || — || November 15, 1999 || Socorro || LINEAR || — || align=right | 1.7 km || 
|-id=245 bgcolor=#fefefe
| 60245 ||  || — || November 15, 1999 || Socorro || LINEAR || — || align=right | 1.9 km || 
|-id=246 bgcolor=#fefefe
| 60246 ||  || — || November 15, 1999 || Socorro || LINEAR || V || align=right | 1.6 km || 
|-id=247 bgcolor=#E9E9E9
| 60247 ||  || — || November 3, 1999 || Kitt Peak || Spacewatch || EUN || align=right | 2.6 km || 
|-id=248 bgcolor=#fefefe
| 60248 ||  || — || November 3, 1999 || Catalina || CSS || — || align=right | 4.3 km || 
|-id=249 bgcolor=#d6d6d6
| 60249 ||  || — || November 4, 1999 || Anderson Mesa || LONEOS || — || align=right | 12 km || 
|-id=250 bgcolor=#d6d6d6
| 60250 ||  || — || November 6, 1999 || Catalina || CSS || URS || align=right | 8.6 km || 
|-id=251 bgcolor=#d6d6d6
| 60251 ||  || — || November 5, 1999 || Kitt Peak || Spacewatch || TIR || align=right | 6.2 km || 
|-id=252 bgcolor=#E9E9E9
| 60252 ||  || — || November 9, 1999 || Kitt Peak || Spacewatch || — || align=right | 1.9 km || 
|-id=253 bgcolor=#d6d6d6
| 60253 ||  || — || November 5, 1999 || Socorro || LINEAR || HYG || align=right | 7.2 km || 
|-id=254 bgcolor=#d6d6d6
| 60254 ||  || — || November 13, 1999 || Catalina || CSS || — || align=right | 11 km || 
|-id=255 bgcolor=#fefefe
| 60255 ||  || — || November 28, 1999 || Oizumi || T. Kobayashi || FLO || align=right | 1.9 km || 
|-id=256 bgcolor=#d6d6d6
| 60256 ||  || — || November 16, 1999 || Catalina || CSS || VER || align=right | 7.3 km || 
|-id=257 bgcolor=#C2FFFF
| 60257 ||  || — || November 28, 1999 || Kitt Peak || Spacewatch || L4 || align=right | 14 km || 
|-id=258 bgcolor=#d6d6d6
| 60258 ||  || — || December 4, 1999 || Catalina || CSS || HYG || align=right | 6.7 km || 
|-id=259 bgcolor=#fefefe
| 60259 ||  || — || December 4, 1999 || Catalina || CSS || — || align=right | 2.6 km || 
|-id=260 bgcolor=#fefefe
| 60260 ||  || — || December 4, 1999 || Catalina || CSS || V || align=right | 1.6 km || 
|-id=261 bgcolor=#d6d6d6
| 60261 ||  || — || December 5, 1999 || Socorro || LINEAR || EOS || align=right | 4.1 km || 
|-id=262 bgcolor=#d6d6d6
| 60262 ||  || — || December 3, 1999 || Socorro || LINEAR || EOS || align=right | 6.2 km || 
|-id=263 bgcolor=#E9E9E9
| 60263 ||  || — || December 5, 1999 || Socorro || LINEAR || EUN || align=right | 4.3 km || 
|-id=264 bgcolor=#E9E9E9
| 60264 ||  || — || December 5, 1999 || Socorro || LINEAR || — || align=right | 3.9 km || 
|-id=265 bgcolor=#d6d6d6
| 60265 ||  || — || December 6, 1999 || Socorro || LINEAR || — || align=right | 11 km || 
|-id=266 bgcolor=#d6d6d6
| 60266 ||  || — || December 6, 1999 || Socorro || LINEAR || 7:4 || align=right | 13 km || 
|-id=267 bgcolor=#d6d6d6
| 60267 ||  || — || December 6, 1999 || Socorro || LINEAR || EOS || align=right | 5.6 km || 
|-id=268 bgcolor=#d6d6d6
| 60268 ||  || — || December 6, 1999 || Farpoint || G. Hug, G. Bell || — || align=right | 11 km || 
|-id=269 bgcolor=#fefefe
| 60269 ||  || — || December 7, 1999 || Socorro || LINEAR || V || align=right | 1.4 km || 
|-id=270 bgcolor=#fefefe
| 60270 ||  || — || December 7, 1999 || Socorro || LINEAR || V || align=right | 1.4 km || 
|-id=271 bgcolor=#fefefe
| 60271 ||  || — || December 7, 1999 || Socorro || LINEAR || — || align=right | 1.6 km || 
|-id=272 bgcolor=#fefefe
| 60272 ||  || — || December 7, 1999 || Socorro || LINEAR || — || align=right | 1.5 km || 
|-id=273 bgcolor=#E9E9E9
| 60273 ||  || — || December 7, 1999 || Socorro || LINEAR || — || align=right | 2.4 km || 
|-id=274 bgcolor=#E9E9E9
| 60274 ||  || — || December 7, 1999 || Socorro || LINEAR || — || align=right | 3.2 km || 
|-id=275 bgcolor=#fefefe
| 60275 ||  || — || December 7, 1999 || Socorro || LINEAR || V || align=right | 2.1 km || 
|-id=276 bgcolor=#fefefe
| 60276 ||  || — || December 7, 1999 || Socorro || LINEAR || — || align=right | 2.0 km || 
|-id=277 bgcolor=#E9E9E9
| 60277 ||  || — || December 7, 1999 || Socorro || LINEAR || — || align=right | 3.7 km || 
|-id=278 bgcolor=#fefefe
| 60278 ||  || — || December 7, 1999 || Socorro || LINEAR || FLO || align=right | 2.0 km || 
|-id=279 bgcolor=#fefefe
| 60279 ||  || — || December 7, 1999 || Socorro || LINEAR || — || align=right | 2.2 km || 
|-id=280 bgcolor=#E9E9E9
| 60280 ||  || — || December 7, 1999 || Socorro || LINEAR || — || align=right | 4.1 km || 
|-id=281 bgcolor=#fefefe
| 60281 ||  || — || December 7, 1999 || Oizumi || T. Kobayashi || NYS || align=right | 1.6 km || 
|-id=282 bgcolor=#fefefe
| 60282 ||  || — || December 7, 1999 || Socorro || LINEAR || NYS || align=right | 2.1 km || 
|-id=283 bgcolor=#fefefe
| 60283 ||  || — || December 7, 1999 || Socorro || LINEAR || V || align=right | 2.1 km || 
|-id=284 bgcolor=#E9E9E9
| 60284 ||  || — || December 7, 1999 || Socorro || LINEAR || EUN || align=right | 3.1 km || 
|-id=285 bgcolor=#fefefe
| 60285 ||  || — || December 4, 1999 || Catalina || CSS || V || align=right | 2.7 km || 
|-id=286 bgcolor=#d6d6d6
| 60286 ||  || — || December 4, 1999 || Catalina || CSS || — || align=right | 7.2 km || 
|-id=287 bgcolor=#fefefe
| 60287 ||  || — || December 7, 1999 || Socorro || LINEAR || — || align=right | 2.1 km || 
|-id=288 bgcolor=#d6d6d6
| 60288 ||  || — || December 11, 1999 || Socorro || LINEAR || — || align=right | 14 km || 
|-id=289 bgcolor=#d6d6d6
| 60289 ||  || — || December 7, 1999 || Catalina || CSS || EOS || align=right | 4.7 km || 
|-id=290 bgcolor=#d6d6d6
| 60290 ||  || — || December 9, 1999 || Fountain Hills || C. W. Juels || — || align=right | 4.5 km || 
|-id=291 bgcolor=#fefefe
| 60291 ||  || — || December 2, 1999 || Kitt Peak || Spacewatch || — || align=right | 4.2 km || 
|-id=292 bgcolor=#fefefe
| 60292 ||  || — || December 14, 1999 || Socorro || LINEAR || — || align=right | 2.7 km || 
|-id=293 bgcolor=#fefefe
| 60293 ||  || — || December 8, 1999 || Kitt Peak || Spacewatch || — || align=right | 1.7 km || 
|-id=294 bgcolor=#fefefe
| 60294 ||  || — || December 7, 1999 || Socorro || LINEAR || V || align=right | 1.0 km || 
|-id=295 bgcolor=#E9E9E9
| 60295 ||  || — || December 8, 1999 || Socorro || LINEAR || — || align=right | 2.6 km || 
|-id=296 bgcolor=#E9E9E9
| 60296 ||  || — || December 8, 1999 || Socorro || LINEAR || — || align=right | 2.4 km || 
|-id=297 bgcolor=#fefefe
| 60297 ||  || — || December 8, 1999 || Socorro || LINEAR || — || align=right | 1.8 km || 
|-id=298 bgcolor=#fefefe
| 60298 ||  || — || December 10, 1999 || Socorro || LINEAR || V || align=right | 2.3 km || 
|-id=299 bgcolor=#E9E9E9
| 60299 ||  || — || December 10, 1999 || Socorro || LINEAR || — || align=right | 4.9 km || 
|-id=300 bgcolor=#fefefe
| 60300 ||  || — || December 10, 1999 || Socorro || LINEAR || PHO || align=right | 4.9 km || 
|}

60301–60400 

|-bgcolor=#fefefe
| 60301 ||  || — || December 10, 1999 || Socorro || LINEAR || V || align=right | 1.9 km || 
|-id=302 bgcolor=#fefefe
| 60302 ||  || — || December 10, 1999 || Socorro || LINEAR || — || align=right | 2.2 km || 
|-id=303 bgcolor=#d6d6d6
| 60303 ||  || — || December 12, 1999 || Socorro || LINEAR || — || align=right | 8.0 km || 
|-id=304 bgcolor=#fefefe
| 60304 ||  || — || December 12, 1999 || Socorro || LINEAR || V || align=right | 1.5 km || 
|-id=305 bgcolor=#fefefe
| 60305 ||  || — || December 12, 1999 || Socorro || LINEAR || ERI || align=right | 6.1 km || 
|-id=306 bgcolor=#d6d6d6
| 60306 ||  || — || December 12, 1999 || Socorro || LINEAR || EOS || align=right | 5.1 km || 
|-id=307 bgcolor=#d6d6d6
| 60307 ||  || — || December 12, 1999 || Socorro || LINEAR || — || align=right | 7.1 km || 
|-id=308 bgcolor=#fefefe
| 60308 ||  || — || December 12, 1999 || Socorro || LINEAR || — || align=right | 1.6 km || 
|-id=309 bgcolor=#fefefe
| 60309 ||  || — || December 12, 1999 || Socorro || LINEAR || FLO || align=right | 2.7 km || 
|-id=310 bgcolor=#E9E9E9
| 60310 ||  || — || December 14, 1999 || Socorro || LINEAR || EUNslow || align=right | 3.3 km || 
|-id=311 bgcolor=#fefefe
| 60311 ||  || — || December 13, 1999 || Kitt Peak || Spacewatch || V || align=right | 1.6 km || 
|-id=312 bgcolor=#fefefe
| 60312 ||  || — || December 13, 1999 || Kitt Peak || Spacewatch || FLO || align=right | 1.3 km || 
|-id=313 bgcolor=#C2FFFF
| 60313 ||  || — || December 15, 1999 || Kitt Peak || Spacewatch || L4 || align=right | 11 km || 
|-id=314 bgcolor=#d6d6d6
| 60314 ||  || — || December 14, 1999 || Kitt Peak || Spacewatch || — || align=right | 7.5 km || 
|-id=315 bgcolor=#fefefe
| 60315 ||  || — || December 15, 1999 || Kitt Peak || Spacewatch || — || align=right | 1.7 km || 
|-id=316 bgcolor=#E9E9E9
| 60316 ||  || — || December 14, 1999 || Kitt Peak || Spacewatch || — || align=right | 2.4 km || 
|-id=317 bgcolor=#fefefe
| 60317 ||  || — || December 4, 1999 || Anderson Mesa || LONEOS || FLO || align=right | 1.8 km || 
|-id=318 bgcolor=#d6d6d6
| 60318 ||  || — || December 3, 1999 || Anderson Mesa || LONEOS || 3:2 || align=right | 11 km || 
|-id=319 bgcolor=#E9E9E9
| 60319 ||  || — || December 12, 1999 || Socorro || LINEAR || EUN || align=right | 2.7 km || 
|-id=320 bgcolor=#d6d6d6
| 60320 ||  || — || December 12, 1999 || Kitt Peak || Spacewatch || — || align=right | 5.5 km || 
|-id=321 bgcolor=#fefefe
| 60321 ||  || — || December 12, 1999 || Kitt Peak || Spacewatch || NYS || align=right | 1.2 km || 
|-id=322 bgcolor=#C2FFFF
| 60322 ||  || — || December 7, 1999 || Socorro || LINEAR || L4 || align=right | 21 km || 
|-id=323 bgcolor=#fefefe
| 60323 ||  || — || December 27, 1999 || Kitt Peak || Spacewatch || FLO || align=right | 2.8 km || 
|-id=324 bgcolor=#E9E9E9
| 60324 ||  || — || December 27, 1999 || Kitt Peak || Spacewatch || VIB || align=right | 3.3 km || 
|-id=325 bgcolor=#fefefe
| 60325 ||  || — || December 27, 1999 || Kitt Peak || Spacewatch || — || align=right | 1.8 km || 
|-id=326 bgcolor=#fefefe
| 60326 ||  || — || December 30, 1999 || Anderson Mesa || LONEOS || V || align=right | 1.7 km || 
|-id=327 bgcolor=#E9E9E9
| 60327 ||  || — || January 4, 2000 || Kitt Peak || Spacewatch || — || align=right | 4.7 km || 
|-id=328 bgcolor=#C2FFFF
| 60328 ||  || — || January 2, 2000 || Socorro || LINEAR || L4 || align=right | 20 km || 
|-id=329 bgcolor=#d6d6d6
| 60329 ||  || — || January 3, 2000 || Socorro || LINEAR || VER || align=right | 10 km || 
|-id=330 bgcolor=#fefefe
| 60330 ||  || — || January 3, 2000 || Socorro || LINEAR || NYS || align=right | 1.7 km || 
|-id=331 bgcolor=#E9E9E9
| 60331 ||  || — || January 3, 2000 || Socorro || LINEAR || — || align=right | 3.5 km || 
|-id=332 bgcolor=#fefefe
| 60332 ||  || — || January 3, 2000 || Socorro || LINEAR || FLO || align=right | 2.2 km || 
|-id=333 bgcolor=#E9E9E9
| 60333 ||  || — || January 3, 2000 || Socorro || LINEAR || — || align=right | 2.2 km || 
|-id=334 bgcolor=#fefefe
| 60334 ||  || — || January 3, 2000 || Socorro || LINEAR || H || align=right | 2.4 km || 
|-id=335 bgcolor=#fefefe
| 60335 ||  || — || January 4, 2000 || Socorro || LINEAR || H || align=right | 1.5 km || 
|-id=336 bgcolor=#E9E9E9
| 60336 ||  || — || January 3, 2000 || Socorro || LINEAR || — || align=right | 2.8 km || 
|-id=337 bgcolor=#E9E9E9
| 60337 ||  || — || January 3, 2000 || Socorro || LINEAR || — || align=right | 2.7 km || 
|-id=338 bgcolor=#E9E9E9
| 60338 ||  || — || January 4, 2000 || Socorro || LINEAR || — || align=right | 2.0 km || 
|-id=339 bgcolor=#E9E9E9
| 60339 ||  || — || January 4, 2000 || Socorro || LINEAR || — || align=right | 3.3 km || 
|-id=340 bgcolor=#fefefe
| 60340 ||  || — || January 4, 2000 || Socorro || LINEAR || FLO || align=right | 1.6 km || 
|-id=341 bgcolor=#E9E9E9
| 60341 ||  || — || January 4, 2000 || Socorro || LINEAR || — || align=right | 2.9 km || 
|-id=342 bgcolor=#fefefe
| 60342 ||  || — || January 5, 2000 || Socorro || LINEAR || — || align=right | 1.9 km || 
|-id=343 bgcolor=#fefefe
| 60343 ||  || — || January 5, 2000 || Socorro || LINEAR || NYS || align=right | 1.6 km || 
|-id=344 bgcolor=#fefefe
| 60344 ||  || — || January 5, 2000 || Socorro || LINEAR || NYS || align=right | 1.8 km || 
|-id=345 bgcolor=#fefefe
| 60345 ||  || — || January 5, 2000 || Socorro || LINEAR || V || align=right | 2.0 km || 
|-id=346 bgcolor=#d6d6d6
| 60346 ||  || — || January 5, 2000 || Socorro || LINEAR || — || align=right | 5.2 km || 
|-id=347 bgcolor=#fefefe
| 60347 ||  || — || January 5, 2000 || Socorro || LINEAR || — || align=right | 1.4 km || 
|-id=348 bgcolor=#fefefe
| 60348 ||  || — || January 5, 2000 || Socorro || LINEAR || V || align=right | 1.7 km || 
|-id=349 bgcolor=#E9E9E9
| 60349 ||  || — || January 5, 2000 || Socorro || LINEAR || — || align=right | 4.8 km || 
|-id=350 bgcolor=#fefefe
| 60350 ||  || — || January 5, 2000 || Socorro || LINEAR || — || align=right | 1.8 km || 
|-id=351 bgcolor=#fefefe
| 60351 ||  || — || January 5, 2000 || Socorro || LINEAR || NYS || align=right | 3.3 km || 
|-id=352 bgcolor=#fefefe
| 60352 ||  || — || January 5, 2000 || Socorro || LINEAR || — || align=right | 1.9 km || 
|-id=353 bgcolor=#fefefe
| 60353 ||  || — || January 5, 2000 || Socorro || LINEAR || — || align=right | 2.0 km || 
|-id=354 bgcolor=#fefefe
| 60354 ||  || — || January 5, 2000 || Socorro || LINEAR || NYS || align=right | 1.9 km || 
|-id=355 bgcolor=#fefefe
| 60355 ||  || — || January 5, 2000 || Socorro || LINEAR || — || align=right | 3.8 km || 
|-id=356 bgcolor=#fefefe
| 60356 ||  || — || January 3, 2000 || Socorro || LINEAR || H || align=right | 1.8 km || 
|-id=357 bgcolor=#E9E9E9
| 60357 ||  || — || January 4, 2000 || Socorro || LINEAR || — || align=right | 6.6 km || 
|-id=358 bgcolor=#fefefe
| 60358 ||  || — || January 5, 2000 || Socorro || LINEAR || V || align=right | 2.8 km || 
|-id=359 bgcolor=#d6d6d6
| 60359 ||  || — || January 5, 2000 || Socorro || LINEAR || — || align=right | 9.6 km || 
|-id=360 bgcolor=#fefefe
| 60360 ||  || — || January 5, 2000 || Socorro || LINEAR || FLO || align=right | 1.7 km || 
|-id=361 bgcolor=#d6d6d6
| 60361 ||  || — || January 5, 2000 || Socorro || LINEAR || EOS || align=right | 4.0 km || 
|-id=362 bgcolor=#E9E9E9
| 60362 ||  || — || January 5, 2000 || Socorro || LINEAR || — || align=right | 4.4 km || 
|-id=363 bgcolor=#E9E9E9
| 60363 ||  || — || January 5, 2000 || Socorro || LINEAR || — || align=right | 4.7 km || 
|-id=364 bgcolor=#E9E9E9
| 60364 ||  || — || January 5, 2000 || Socorro || LINEAR || AGN || align=right | 2.9 km || 
|-id=365 bgcolor=#fefefe
| 60365 ||  || — || January 5, 2000 || Socorro || LINEAR || — || align=right | 1.7 km || 
|-id=366 bgcolor=#fefefe
| 60366 ||  || — || January 5, 2000 || Socorro || LINEAR || FLO || align=right | 2.1 km || 
|-id=367 bgcolor=#E9E9E9
| 60367 ||  || — || January 5, 2000 || Socorro || LINEAR || — || align=right | 3.4 km || 
|-id=368 bgcolor=#d6d6d6
| 60368 ||  || — || January 5, 2000 || Socorro || LINEAR || EMA || align=right | 8.2 km || 
|-id=369 bgcolor=#fefefe
| 60369 ||  || — || January 5, 2000 || Socorro || LINEAR || NYS || align=right | 1.5 km || 
|-id=370 bgcolor=#d6d6d6
| 60370 ||  || — || January 5, 2000 || Socorro || LINEAR || — || align=right | 6.4 km || 
|-id=371 bgcolor=#fefefe
| 60371 ||  || — || January 5, 2000 || Socorro || LINEAR || — || align=right | 4.0 km || 
|-id=372 bgcolor=#fefefe
| 60372 ||  || — || January 5, 2000 || Socorro || LINEAR || V || align=right | 1.7 km || 
|-id=373 bgcolor=#fefefe
| 60373 ||  || — || January 5, 2000 || Socorro || LINEAR || — || align=right | 2.8 km || 
|-id=374 bgcolor=#fefefe
| 60374 ||  || — || January 5, 2000 || Socorro || LINEAR || H || align=right | 1.2 km || 
|-id=375 bgcolor=#FA8072
| 60375 ||  || — || January 8, 2000 || Socorro || LINEAR || H || align=right | 3.1 km || 
|-id=376 bgcolor=#fefefe
| 60376 ||  || — || January 7, 2000 || Socorro || LINEAR || — || align=right | 2.1 km || 
|-id=377 bgcolor=#d6d6d6
| 60377 ||  || — || January 8, 2000 || Socorro || LINEAR || — || align=right | 11 km || 
|-id=378 bgcolor=#d6d6d6
| 60378 ||  || — || January 8, 2000 || Socorro || LINEAR || TIR || align=right | 7.1 km || 
|-id=379 bgcolor=#d6d6d6
| 60379 ||  || — || January 8, 2000 || Socorro || LINEAR || — || align=right | 6.7 km || 
|-id=380 bgcolor=#E9E9E9
| 60380 ||  || — || January 7, 2000 || Socorro || LINEAR || — || align=right | 3.1 km || 
|-id=381 bgcolor=#d6d6d6
| 60381 ||  || — || January 7, 2000 || Socorro || LINEAR || 3:2 || align=right | 15 km || 
|-id=382 bgcolor=#fefefe
| 60382 ||  || — || January 7, 2000 || Socorro || LINEAR || V || align=right | 1.8 km || 
|-id=383 bgcolor=#C2FFFF
| 60383 ||  || — || January 7, 2000 || Socorro || LINEAR || L4 || align=right | 35 km || 
|-id=384 bgcolor=#d6d6d6
| 60384 ||  || — || January 8, 2000 || Socorro || LINEAR || — || align=right | 9.2 km || 
|-id=385 bgcolor=#fefefe
| 60385 ||  || — || January 8, 2000 || Socorro || LINEAR || — || align=right | 4.2 km || 
|-id=386 bgcolor=#E9E9E9
| 60386 ||  || — || January 10, 2000 || Socorro || LINEAR || — || align=right | 8.6 km || 
|-id=387 bgcolor=#d6d6d6
| 60387 ||  || — || January 3, 2000 || Kitt Peak || Spacewatch || — || align=right | 4.5 km || 
|-id=388 bgcolor=#C2FFFF
| 60388 ||  || — || January 8, 2000 || Kitt Peak || Spacewatch || L4 || align=right | 12 km || 
|-id=389 bgcolor=#fefefe
| 60389 ||  || — || January 8, 2000 || Kitt Peak || Spacewatch || — || align=right | 1.5 km || 
|-id=390 bgcolor=#fefefe
| 60390 ||  || — || January 9, 2000 || Kitt Peak || Spacewatch || — || align=right | 1.5 km || 
|-id=391 bgcolor=#fefefe
| 60391 ||  || — || January 11, 2000 || Kitt Peak || Spacewatch || — || align=right | 1.8 km || 
|-id=392 bgcolor=#fefefe
| 60392 ||  || — || January 10, 2000 || Kitt Peak || Spacewatch || FLO || align=right | 2.1 km || 
|-id=393 bgcolor=#E9E9E9
| 60393 ||  || — || January 4, 2000 || Socorro || LINEAR || — || align=right | 3.2 km || 
|-id=394 bgcolor=#fefefe
| 60394 ||  || — || January 5, 2000 || Socorro || LINEAR || V || align=right | 1.6 km || 
|-id=395 bgcolor=#d6d6d6
| 60395 ||  || — || January 5, 2000 || Socorro || LINEAR || — || align=right | 14 km || 
|-id=396 bgcolor=#FA8072
| 60396 ||  || — || January 7, 2000 || Anderson Mesa || LONEOS || H || align=right | 1.9 km || 
|-id=397 bgcolor=#E9E9E9
| 60397 ||  || — || January 7, 2000 || Anderson Mesa || LONEOS || — || align=right | 6.5 km || 
|-id=398 bgcolor=#d6d6d6
| 60398 ||  || — || January 4, 2000 || Socorro || LINEAR || 3:2 || align=right | 12 km || 
|-id=399 bgcolor=#C2FFFF
| 60399 ||  || — || January 7, 2000 || Kitt Peak || Spacewatch || L4 || align=right | 17 km || 
|-id=400 bgcolor=#fefefe
| 60400 ||  || — || January 29, 2000 || Socorro || LINEAR || V || align=right | 2.0 km || 
|}

60401–60500 

|-bgcolor=#C2FFFF
| 60401 ||  || — || January 29, 2000 || Kitt Peak || Spacewatch || L4 || align=right | 18 km || 
|-id=402 bgcolor=#fefefe
| 60402 ||  || — || January 30, 2000 || Socorro || LINEAR || — || align=right | 2.2 km || 
|-id=403 bgcolor=#E9E9E9
| 60403 ||  || — || January 27, 2000 || Kitt Peak || Spacewatch || — || align=right | 5.2 km || 
|-id=404 bgcolor=#fefefe
| 60404 ||  || — || January 26, 2000 || Kitt Peak || Spacewatch || — || align=right | 1.3 km || 
|-id=405 bgcolor=#E9E9E9
| 60405 ||  || — || January 30, 2000 || Catalina || CSS || — || align=right | 2.2 km || 
|-id=406 bgcolor=#fefefe
| 60406 Albertosuci ||  ||  || February 3, 2000 || San Marcello || L. Tesi, A. Boattini || FLO || align=right | 1.9 km || 
|-id=407 bgcolor=#d6d6d6
| 60407 ||  || — || February 2, 2000 || Uenohara || N. Kawasato || — || align=right | 5.1 km || 
|-id=408 bgcolor=#fefefe
| 60408 ||  || — || February 2, 2000 || Socorro || LINEAR || V || align=right | 1.6 km || 
|-id=409 bgcolor=#fefefe
| 60409 ||  || — || February 2, 2000 || Socorro || LINEAR || FLO || align=right | 2.4 km || 
|-id=410 bgcolor=#d6d6d6
| 60410 ||  || — || February 2, 2000 || Socorro || LINEAR || — || align=right | 6.0 km || 
|-id=411 bgcolor=#fefefe
| 60411 ||  || — || February 2, 2000 || Socorro || LINEAR || NYS || align=right | 2.1 km || 
|-id=412 bgcolor=#d6d6d6
| 60412 ||  || — || February 2, 2000 || Socorro || LINEAR || — || align=right | 4.6 km || 
|-id=413 bgcolor=#E9E9E9
| 60413 ||  || — || February 2, 2000 || Socorro || LINEAR || — || align=right | 3.5 km || 
|-id=414 bgcolor=#E9E9E9
| 60414 ||  || — || February 2, 2000 || Socorro || LINEAR || — || align=right | 2.5 km || 
|-id=415 bgcolor=#E9E9E9
| 60415 ||  || — || February 2, 2000 || Socorro || LINEAR || MAR || align=right | 2.9 km || 
|-id=416 bgcolor=#fefefe
| 60416 ||  || — || February 2, 2000 || Socorro || LINEAR || FLO || align=right | 1.8 km || 
|-id=417 bgcolor=#E9E9E9
| 60417 ||  || — || February 2, 2000 || Socorro || LINEAR || — || align=right | 3.2 km || 
|-id=418 bgcolor=#d6d6d6
| 60418 ||  || — || February 2, 2000 || Socorro || LINEAR || TIR || align=right | 6.9 km || 
|-id=419 bgcolor=#fefefe
| 60419 ||  || — || February 2, 2000 || Socorro || LINEAR || MAS || align=right | 2.7 km || 
|-id=420 bgcolor=#fefefe
| 60420 ||  || — || February 2, 2000 || Socorro || LINEAR || — || align=right | 2.1 km || 
|-id=421 bgcolor=#C2FFFF
| 60421 ||  || — || February 2, 2000 || Socorro || LINEAR || L4 || align=right | 14 km || 
|-id=422 bgcolor=#fefefe
| 60422 ||  || — || February 2, 2000 || Socorro || LINEAR || — || align=right | 2.8 km || 
|-id=423 bgcolor=#fefefe
| 60423 Chvojen ||  ||  || February 4, 2000 || Kleť || M. Tichý || H || align=right | 1.2 km || 
|-id=424 bgcolor=#fefefe
| 60424 ||  || — || February 2, 2000 || Socorro || LINEAR || FLO || align=right | 3.6 km || 
|-id=425 bgcolor=#E9E9E9
| 60425 ||  || — || February 2, 2000 || Socorro || LINEAR || — || align=right | 5.1 km || 
|-id=426 bgcolor=#E9E9E9
| 60426 ||  || — || February 2, 2000 || Socorro || LINEAR || — || align=right | 5.5 km || 
|-id=427 bgcolor=#fefefe
| 60427 ||  || — || February 2, 2000 || Socorro || LINEAR || NYS || align=right | 1.4 km || 
|-id=428 bgcolor=#E9E9E9
| 60428 ||  || — || February 2, 2000 || Socorro || LINEAR || — || align=right | 4.7 km || 
|-id=429 bgcolor=#fefefe
| 60429 ||  || — || February 2, 2000 || Socorro || LINEAR || — || align=right | 1.7 km || 
|-id=430 bgcolor=#E9E9E9
| 60430 ||  || — || February 3, 2000 || Socorro || LINEAR || HEN || align=right | 2.4 km || 
|-id=431 bgcolor=#fefefe
| 60431 ||  || — || February 5, 2000 || Socorro || LINEAR || — || align=right | 3.6 km || 
|-id=432 bgcolor=#fefefe
| 60432 ||  || — || February 2, 2000 || Socorro || LINEAR || V || align=right | 1.7 km || 
|-id=433 bgcolor=#E9E9E9
| 60433 ||  || — || February 2, 2000 || Socorro || LINEAR || — || align=right | 3.4 km || 
|-id=434 bgcolor=#E9E9E9
| 60434 ||  || — || February 2, 2000 || Socorro || LINEAR || EUN || align=right | 3.7 km || 
|-id=435 bgcolor=#E9E9E9
| 60435 ||  || — || February 3, 2000 || Socorro || LINEAR || EUN || align=right | 2.7 km || 
|-id=436 bgcolor=#E9E9E9
| 60436 ||  || — || February 7, 2000 || Socorro || LINEAR || — || align=right | 3.3 km || 
|-id=437 bgcolor=#fefefe
| 60437 ||  || — || February 10, 2000 || Višnjan Observatory || K. Korlević || — || align=right | 1.8 km || 
|-id=438 bgcolor=#E9E9E9
| 60438 ||  || — || February 7, 2000 || Kitt Peak || Spacewatch || — || align=right | 3.1 km || 
|-id=439 bgcolor=#fefefe
| 60439 ||  || — || February 4, 2000 || Socorro || LINEAR || — || align=right | 2.0 km || 
|-id=440 bgcolor=#d6d6d6
| 60440 ||  || — || February 4, 2000 || Socorro || LINEAR || — || align=right | 9.0 km || 
|-id=441 bgcolor=#fefefe
| 60441 ||  || — || February 4, 2000 || Socorro || LINEAR || MAS || align=right | 1.7 km || 
|-id=442 bgcolor=#E9E9E9
| 60442 ||  || — || February 4, 2000 || Socorro || LINEAR || — || align=right | 5.7 km || 
|-id=443 bgcolor=#E9E9E9
| 60443 ||  || — || February 4, 2000 || Socorro || LINEAR || — || align=right | 6.2 km || 
|-id=444 bgcolor=#d6d6d6
| 60444 ||  || — || February 4, 2000 || Socorro || LINEAR || KOR || align=right | 4.8 km || 
|-id=445 bgcolor=#E9E9E9
| 60445 ||  || — || February 4, 2000 || Socorro || LINEAR || — || align=right | 6.1 km || 
|-id=446 bgcolor=#d6d6d6
| 60446 ||  || — || February 4, 2000 || Socorro || LINEAR || THM || align=right | 7.0 km || 
|-id=447 bgcolor=#E9E9E9
| 60447 ||  || — || February 6, 2000 || Socorro || LINEAR || — || align=right | 3.3 km || 
|-id=448 bgcolor=#fefefe
| 60448 ||  || — || February 6, 2000 || Socorro || LINEAR || — || align=right | 4.4 km || 
|-id=449 bgcolor=#d6d6d6
| 60449 ||  || — || February 6, 2000 || Socorro || LINEAR || KOR || align=right | 4.7 km || 
|-id=450 bgcolor=#fefefe
| 60450 ||  || — || February 6, 2000 || Socorro || LINEAR || — || align=right | 2.1 km || 
|-id=451 bgcolor=#E9E9E9
| 60451 ||  || — || February 6, 2000 || Socorro || LINEAR || — || align=right | 6.2 km || 
|-id=452 bgcolor=#fefefe
| 60452 ||  || — || February 6, 2000 || Socorro || LINEAR || — || align=right | 1.7 km || 
|-id=453 bgcolor=#E9E9E9
| 60453 ||  || — || February 2, 2000 || Socorro || LINEAR || — || align=right | 2.4 km || 
|-id=454 bgcolor=#C2E0FF
| 60454 ||  || — || February 5, 2000 || Kitt Peak || M. W. Buie || cubewano (cold)critical || align=right | 200 km || 
|-id=455 bgcolor=#E9E9E9
| 60455 ||  || — || February 5, 2000 || Kitt Peak || M. W. Buie || — || align=right | 4.8 km || 
|-id=456 bgcolor=#d6d6d6
| 60456 ||  || — || February 5, 2000 || Catalina || CSS || — || align=right | 8.7 km || 
|-id=457 bgcolor=#fefefe
| 60457 ||  || — || February 5, 2000 || Catalina || CSS || — || align=right | 2.6 km || 
|-id=458 bgcolor=#C2E0FF
| 60458 ||  || — || February 5, 2000 || Kitt Peak || M. W. Buie || SDOmooncritical || align=right | 148 km || 
|-id=459 bgcolor=#E9E9E9
| 60459 ||  || — || February 2, 2000 || Socorro || LINEAR || — || align=right | 2.1 km || 
|-id=460 bgcolor=#E9E9E9
| 60460 ||  || — || February 26, 2000 || Kitt Peak || Spacewatch || NEM || align=right | 4.7 km || 
|-id=461 bgcolor=#fefefe
| 60461 ||  || — || February 28, 2000 || Socorro || LINEAR || — || align=right | 1.7 km || 
|-id=462 bgcolor=#fefefe
| 60462 ||  || — || February 28, 2000 || Socorro || LINEAR || — || align=right | 3.1 km || 
|-id=463 bgcolor=#d6d6d6
| 60463 ||  || — || February 28, 2000 || Socorro || LINEAR || — || align=right | 4.8 km || 
|-id=464 bgcolor=#E9E9E9
| 60464 ||  || — || February 28, 2000 || Socorro || LINEAR || — || align=right | 2.4 km || 
|-id=465 bgcolor=#d6d6d6
| 60465 ||  || — || February 26, 2000 || Kitt Peak || Spacewatch || KOR || align=right | 3.9 km || 
|-id=466 bgcolor=#fefefe
| 60466 ||  || — || February 27, 2000 || Kitt Peak || Spacewatch || NYS || align=right | 4.8 km || 
|-id=467 bgcolor=#fefefe
| 60467 ||  || — || February 28, 2000 || Kitt Peak || Spacewatch || — || align=right | 2.6 km || 
|-id=468 bgcolor=#E9E9E9
| 60468 ||  || — || February 28, 2000 || Socorro || LINEAR || — || align=right | 6.2 km || 
|-id=469 bgcolor=#fefefe
| 60469 ||  || — || February 29, 2000 || Socorro || LINEAR || — || align=right | 1.4 km || 
|-id=470 bgcolor=#fefefe
| 60470 ||  || — || February 29, 2000 || Socorro || LINEAR || FLO || align=right | 1.9 km || 
|-id=471 bgcolor=#fefefe
| 60471 ||  || — || February 29, 2000 || Socorro || LINEAR || NYS || align=right | 1.9 km || 
|-id=472 bgcolor=#E9E9E9
| 60472 ||  || — || February 29, 2000 || Socorro || LINEAR || — || align=right | 2.5 km || 
|-id=473 bgcolor=#d6d6d6
| 60473 ||  || — || February 29, 2000 || Socorro || LINEAR || — || align=right | 10 km || 
|-id=474 bgcolor=#d6d6d6
| 60474 ||  || — || February 29, 2000 || Socorro || LINEAR || — || align=right | 3.0 km || 
|-id=475 bgcolor=#d6d6d6
| 60475 ||  || — || February 29, 2000 || Socorro || LINEAR || — || align=right | 6.2 km || 
|-id=476 bgcolor=#E9E9E9
| 60476 ||  || — || February 29, 2000 || Socorro || LINEAR || — || align=right | 4.4 km || 
|-id=477 bgcolor=#E9E9E9
| 60477 ||  || — || February 29, 2000 || Socorro || LINEAR || — || align=right | 3.6 km || 
|-id=478 bgcolor=#E9E9E9
| 60478 ||  || — || February 29, 2000 || Socorro || LINEAR || HEN || align=right | 2.4 km || 
|-id=479 bgcolor=#E9E9E9
| 60479 ||  || — || February 29, 2000 || Socorro || LINEAR || HEN || align=right | 2.0 km || 
|-id=480 bgcolor=#d6d6d6
| 60480 ||  || — || February 29, 2000 || Socorro || LINEAR || — || align=right | 7.4 km || 
|-id=481 bgcolor=#E9E9E9
| 60481 ||  || — || February 29, 2000 || Socorro || LINEAR || — || align=right | 5.3 km || 
|-id=482 bgcolor=#fefefe
| 60482 ||  || — || February 29, 2000 || Socorro || LINEAR || FLO || align=right | 1.0 km || 
|-id=483 bgcolor=#E9E9E9
| 60483 ||  || — || February 29, 2000 || Socorro || LINEAR || — || align=right | 3.1 km || 
|-id=484 bgcolor=#fefefe
| 60484 ||  || — || February 29, 2000 || Socorro || LINEAR || NYS || align=right | 1.5 km || 
|-id=485 bgcolor=#fefefe
| 60485 ||  || — || February 29, 2000 || Socorro || LINEAR || — || align=right | 1.7 km || 
|-id=486 bgcolor=#d6d6d6
| 60486 ||  || — || February 29, 2000 || Socorro || LINEAR || KOR || align=right | 2.7 km || 
|-id=487 bgcolor=#fefefe
| 60487 ||  || — || February 29, 2000 || Socorro || LINEAR || — || align=right | 1.5 km || 
|-id=488 bgcolor=#E9E9E9
| 60488 ||  || — || February 29, 2000 || Socorro || LINEAR || — || align=right | 5.5 km || 
|-id=489 bgcolor=#E9E9E9
| 60489 ||  || — || February 29, 2000 || Socorro || LINEAR || WIT || align=right | 2.4 km || 
|-id=490 bgcolor=#E9E9E9
| 60490 ||  || — || February 29, 2000 || Socorro || LINEAR || — || align=right | 3.7 km || 
|-id=491 bgcolor=#fefefe
| 60491 ||  || — || February 29, 2000 || Socorro || LINEAR || NYS || align=right | 2.7 km || 
|-id=492 bgcolor=#fefefe
| 60492 ||  || — || February 28, 2000 || Socorro || LINEAR || V || align=right | 1.7 km || 
|-id=493 bgcolor=#E9E9E9
| 60493 ||  || — || February 28, 2000 || Socorro || LINEAR || — || align=right | 2.9 km || 
|-id=494 bgcolor=#E9E9E9
| 60494 ||  || — || February 29, 2000 || Socorro || LINEAR || — || align=right | 3.0 km || 
|-id=495 bgcolor=#fefefe
| 60495 ||  || — || February 29, 2000 || Socorro || LINEAR || NYS || align=right | 3.1 km || 
|-id=496 bgcolor=#E9E9E9
| 60496 ||  || — || February 26, 2000 || Kitt Peak || Spacewatch || — || align=right | 2.4 km || 
|-id=497 bgcolor=#d6d6d6
| 60497 ||  || — || February 27, 2000 || Kitt Peak || Spacewatch || — || align=right | 8.2 km || 
|-id=498 bgcolor=#d6d6d6
| 60498 ||  || — || February 27, 2000 || Kitt Peak || Spacewatch || — || align=right | 7.8 km || 
|-id=499 bgcolor=#E9E9E9
| 60499 ||  || — || February 28, 2000 || Socorro || LINEAR || HEN || align=right | 2.4 km || 
|-id=500 bgcolor=#fefefe
| 60500 ||  || — || February 28, 2000 || Socorro || LINEAR || — || align=right | 1.7 km || 
|}

60501–60600 

|-bgcolor=#d6d6d6
| 60501 ||  || — || February 29, 2000 || Socorro || LINEAR || — || align=right | 6.0 km || 
|-id=502 bgcolor=#fefefe
| 60502 ||  || — || February 29, 2000 || Socorro || LINEAR || — || align=right | 1.7 km || 
|-id=503 bgcolor=#d6d6d6
| 60503 ||  || — || February 29, 2000 || Socorro || LINEAR || — || align=right | 5.1 km || 
|-id=504 bgcolor=#E9E9E9
| 60504 ||  || — || February 29, 2000 || Socorro || LINEAR || — || align=right | 7.7 km || 
|-id=505 bgcolor=#fefefe
| 60505 ||  || — || February 29, 2000 || Socorro || LINEAR || FLO || align=right | 1.5 km || 
|-id=506 bgcolor=#fefefe
| 60506 ||  || — || February 29, 2000 || Socorro || LINEAR || FLO || align=right | 2.2 km || 
|-id=507 bgcolor=#fefefe
| 60507 ||  || — || February 29, 2000 || Socorro || LINEAR || V || align=right | 2.2 km || 
|-id=508 bgcolor=#d6d6d6
| 60508 ||  || — || February 29, 2000 || Socorro || LINEAR || — || align=right | 6.8 km || 
|-id=509 bgcolor=#fefefe
| 60509 ||  || — || March 3, 2000 || Socorro || LINEAR || — || align=right | 2.2 km || 
|-id=510 bgcolor=#E9E9E9
| 60510 ||  || — || March 3, 2000 || Socorro || LINEAR || — || align=right | 3.8 km || 
|-id=511 bgcolor=#fefefe
| 60511 ||  || — || March 3, 2000 || Socorro || LINEAR || H || align=right | 1.3 km || 
|-id=512 bgcolor=#d6d6d6
| 60512 ||  || — || March 3, 2000 || Socorro || LINEAR || EOS || align=right | 3.3 km || 
|-id=513 bgcolor=#fefefe
| 60513 ||  || — || March 4, 2000 || Socorro || LINEAR || — || align=right | 1.6 km || 
|-id=514 bgcolor=#E9E9E9
| 60514 ||  || — || March 4, 2000 || Socorro || LINEAR || AGN || align=right | 2.7 km || 
|-id=515 bgcolor=#fefefe
| 60515 ||  || — || March 5, 2000 || Višnjan Observatory || K. Korlević || — || align=right | 4.2 km || 
|-id=516 bgcolor=#d6d6d6
| 60516 ||  || — || March 3, 2000 || Socorro || LINEAR || — || align=right | 5.8 km || 
|-id=517 bgcolor=#fefefe
| 60517 ||  || — || March 4, 2000 || Socorro || LINEAR || V || align=right | 1.5 km || 
|-id=518 bgcolor=#fefefe
| 60518 ||  || — || March 5, 2000 || Socorro || LINEAR || FLO || align=right | 1.5 km || 
|-id=519 bgcolor=#fefefe
| 60519 ||  || — || March 8, 2000 || Kitt Peak || Spacewatch || NYS || align=right | 2.3 km || 
|-id=520 bgcolor=#d6d6d6
| 60520 ||  || — || March 5, 2000 || Socorro || LINEAR || EOS || align=right | 5.8 km || 
|-id=521 bgcolor=#E9E9E9
| 60521 ||  || — || March 5, 2000 || Socorro || LINEAR || — || align=right | 5.8 km || 
|-id=522 bgcolor=#d6d6d6
| 60522 ||  || — || March 8, 2000 || Socorro || LINEAR || — || align=right | 9.6 km || 
|-id=523 bgcolor=#fefefe
| 60523 ||  || — || March 8, 2000 || Socorro || LINEAR || NYS || align=right | 1.6 km || 
|-id=524 bgcolor=#d6d6d6
| 60524 ||  || — || March 8, 2000 || Socorro || LINEAR || — || align=right | 6.6 km || 
|-id=525 bgcolor=#E9E9E9
| 60525 ||  || — || March 8, 2000 || Socorro || LINEAR || — || align=right | 3.1 km || 
|-id=526 bgcolor=#E9E9E9
| 60526 ||  || — || March 8, 2000 || Socorro || LINEAR || — || align=right | 2.5 km || 
|-id=527 bgcolor=#d6d6d6
| 60527 ||  || — || March 8, 2000 || Socorro || LINEAR || THM || align=right | 6.7 km || 
|-id=528 bgcolor=#E9E9E9
| 60528 ||  || — || March 9, 2000 || Socorro || LINEAR || — || align=right | 3.1 km || 
|-id=529 bgcolor=#fefefe
| 60529 ||  || — || March 9, 2000 || Socorro || LINEAR || — || align=right | 1.5 km || 
|-id=530 bgcolor=#E9E9E9
| 60530 ||  || — || March 9, 2000 || Socorro || LINEAR || — || align=right | 3.3 km || 
|-id=531 bgcolor=#E9E9E9
| 60531 ||  || — || March 9, 2000 || Tebbutt || F. B. Zoltowski || — || align=right | 5.3 km || 
|-id=532 bgcolor=#E9E9E9
| 60532 Henson ||  ||  || March 11, 2000 || Catalina || CSS || BRU || align=right | 7.4 km || 
|-id=533 bgcolor=#E9E9E9
| 60533 ||  || — || March 10, 2000 || Kitt Peak || Spacewatch || — || align=right | 5.4 km || 
|-id=534 bgcolor=#fefefe
| 60534 ||  || — || March 5, 2000 || Socorro || LINEAR || — || align=right | 1.6 km || 
|-id=535 bgcolor=#fefefe
| 60535 ||  || — || March 8, 2000 || Socorro || LINEAR || MAS || align=right | 2.3 km || 
|-id=536 bgcolor=#fefefe
| 60536 ||  || — || March 8, 2000 || Socorro || LINEAR || NYS || align=right | 1.3 km || 
|-id=537 bgcolor=#fefefe
| 60537 ||  || — || March 9, 2000 || Socorro || LINEAR || NYS || align=right | 1.1 km || 
|-id=538 bgcolor=#E9E9E9
| 60538 ||  || — || March 10, 2000 || Socorro || LINEAR || — || align=right | 3.2 km || 
|-id=539 bgcolor=#d6d6d6
| 60539 ||  || — || March 10, 2000 || Socorro || LINEAR || — || align=right | 5.6 km || 
|-id=540 bgcolor=#fefefe
| 60540 ||  || — || March 10, 2000 || Socorro || LINEAR || FLO || align=right | 1.9 km || 
|-id=541 bgcolor=#E9E9E9
| 60541 ||  || — || March 10, 2000 || Socorro || LINEAR || MRX || align=right | 3.2 km || 
|-id=542 bgcolor=#fefefe
| 60542 ||  || — || March 10, 2000 || Socorro || LINEAR || MAS || align=right | 5.2 km || 
|-id=543 bgcolor=#fefefe
| 60543 ||  || — || March 5, 2000 || Socorro || LINEAR || — || align=right | 1.8 km || 
|-id=544 bgcolor=#E9E9E9
| 60544 ||  || — || March 5, 2000 || Socorro || LINEAR || — || align=right | 4.3 km || 
|-id=545 bgcolor=#d6d6d6
| 60545 ||  || — || March 5, 2000 || Socorro || LINEAR || — || align=right | 4.6 km || 
|-id=546 bgcolor=#E9E9E9
| 60546 ||  || — || March 8, 2000 || Socorro || LINEAR || EUN || align=right | 3.4 km || 
|-id=547 bgcolor=#fefefe
| 60547 ||  || — || March 8, 2000 || Socorro || LINEAR || — || align=right | 2.9 km || 
|-id=548 bgcolor=#fefefe
| 60548 ||  || — || March 8, 2000 || Socorro || LINEAR || — || align=right | 2.2 km || 
|-id=549 bgcolor=#fefefe
| 60549 ||  || — || March 8, 2000 || Socorro || LINEAR || ERI || align=right | 4.9 km || 
|-id=550 bgcolor=#E9E9E9
| 60550 ||  || — || March 8, 2000 || Socorro || LINEAR || — || align=right | 3.5 km || 
|-id=551 bgcolor=#d6d6d6
| 60551 ||  || — || March 9, 2000 || Socorro || LINEAR || EOS || align=right | 4.3 km || 
|-id=552 bgcolor=#d6d6d6
| 60552 ||  || — || March 9, 2000 || Socorro || LINEAR || KOR || align=right | 3.5 km || 
|-id=553 bgcolor=#fefefe
| 60553 ||  || — || March 9, 2000 || Socorro || LINEAR || V || align=right | 3.1 km || 
|-id=554 bgcolor=#E9E9E9
| 60554 ||  || — || March 9, 2000 || Socorro || LINEAR || EUN || align=right | 3.2 km || 
|-id=555 bgcolor=#fefefe
| 60555 ||  || — || March 9, 2000 || Socorro || LINEAR || V || align=right | 2.0 km || 
|-id=556 bgcolor=#E9E9E9
| 60556 ||  || — || March 10, 2000 || Socorro || LINEAR || MAR || align=right | 3.4 km || 
|-id=557 bgcolor=#fefefe
| 60557 ||  || — || March 10, 2000 || Socorro || LINEAR || — || align=right | 1.2 km || 
|-id=558 bgcolor=#C7FF8F
| 60558 Echeclus ||  ||  || March 3, 2000 || Kitt Peak || Spacewatch || centaur || align=right | 59 km || 
|-id=559 bgcolor=#d6d6d6
| 60559 ||  || — || March 9, 2000 || Kitt Peak || Spacewatch || THM || align=right | 6.9 km || 
|-id=560 bgcolor=#fefefe
| 60560 ||  || — || March 12, 2000 || Socorro || LINEAR || ERI || align=right | 4.2 km || 
|-id=561 bgcolor=#fefefe
| 60561 ||  || — || March 11, 2000 || Anderson Mesa || LONEOS || — || align=right | 1.3 km || 
|-id=562 bgcolor=#E9E9E9
| 60562 ||  || — || March 11, 2000 || Anderson Mesa || LONEOS || AER || align=right | 4.3 km || 
|-id=563 bgcolor=#fefefe
| 60563 ||  || — || March 5, 2000 || Haleakala || NEAT || — || align=right | 1.3 km || 
|-id=564 bgcolor=#fefefe
| 60564 ||  || — || March 8, 2000 || Haleakala || NEAT || — || align=right | 1.7 km || 
|-id=565 bgcolor=#E9E9E9
| 60565 ||  || — || March 8, 2000 || Socorro || LINEAR || RAF || align=right | 3.0 km || 
|-id=566 bgcolor=#E9E9E9
| 60566 ||  || — || March 8, 2000 || Haleakala || NEAT || — || align=right | 4.1 km || 
|-id=567 bgcolor=#E9E9E9
| 60567 ||  || — || March 8, 2000 || Haleakala || NEAT || — || align=right | 5.7 km || 
|-id=568 bgcolor=#E9E9E9
| 60568 ||  || — || March 8, 2000 || Haleakala || NEAT || GEF || align=right | 2.7 km || 
|-id=569 bgcolor=#fefefe
| 60569 ||  || — || March 9, 2000 || Socorro || LINEAR || NYS || align=right | 1.6 km || 
|-id=570 bgcolor=#d6d6d6
| 60570 ||  || — || March 9, 2000 || Kitt Peak || Spacewatch || — || align=right | 6.1 km || 
|-id=571 bgcolor=#fefefe
| 60571 ||  || — || March 10, 2000 || Socorro || LINEAR || NYS || align=right | 5.0 km || 
|-id=572 bgcolor=#E9E9E9
| 60572 ||  || — || March 10, 2000 || Socorro || LINEAR || — || align=right | 4.7 km || 
|-id=573 bgcolor=#E9E9E9
| 60573 ||  || — || March 11, 2000 || Anderson Mesa || LONEOS || — || align=right | 4.0 km || 
|-id=574 bgcolor=#d6d6d6
| 60574 ||  || — || March 11, 2000 || Anderson Mesa || LONEOS || — || align=right | 9.2 km || 
|-id=575 bgcolor=#E9E9E9
| 60575 ||  || — || March 11, 2000 || Anderson Mesa || LONEOS || — || align=right | 2.6 km || 
|-id=576 bgcolor=#d6d6d6
| 60576 ||  || — || March 11, 2000 || Anderson Mesa || LONEOS || KOR || align=right | 4.0 km || 
|-id=577 bgcolor=#d6d6d6
| 60577 ||  || — || March 11, 2000 || Socorro || LINEAR || — || align=right | 5.7 km || 
|-id=578 bgcolor=#E9E9E9
| 60578 ||  || — || March 11, 2000 || Catalina || CSS || — || align=right | 2.8 km || 
|-id=579 bgcolor=#E9E9E9
| 60579 ||  || — || March 11, 2000 || Anderson Mesa || LONEOS || — || align=right | 3.2 km || 
|-id=580 bgcolor=#fefefe
| 60580 ||  || — || March 11, 2000 || Anderson Mesa || LONEOS || — || align=right | 1.7 km || 
|-id=581 bgcolor=#E9E9E9
| 60581 ||  || — || March 11, 2000 || Anderson Mesa || LONEOS || — || align=right | 4.1 km || 
|-id=582 bgcolor=#fefefe
| 60582 ||  || — || March 11, 2000 || Anderson Mesa || LONEOS || NYS || align=right | 1.5 km || 
|-id=583 bgcolor=#fefefe
| 60583 ||  || — || March 11, 2000 || Socorro || LINEAR || FLO || align=right | 1.2 km || 
|-id=584 bgcolor=#E9E9E9
| 60584 ||  || — || March 11, 2000 || Socorro || LINEAR || — || align=right | 3.5 km || 
|-id=585 bgcolor=#fefefe
| 60585 ||  || — || March 11, 2000 || Socorro || LINEAR || — || align=right | 1.3 km || 
|-id=586 bgcolor=#E9E9E9
| 60586 ||  || — || March 12, 2000 || Socorro || LINEAR || — || align=right | 2.5 km || 
|-id=587 bgcolor=#E9E9E9
| 60587 ||  || — || March 11, 2000 || Socorro || LINEAR || — || align=right | 3.4 km || 
|-id=588 bgcolor=#fefefe
| 60588 ||  || — || March 12, 2000 || Catalina || CSS || V || align=right | 2.6 km || 
|-id=589 bgcolor=#d6d6d6
| 60589 ||  || — || March 12, 2000 || Catalina || CSS || — || align=right | 9.8 km || 
|-id=590 bgcolor=#E9E9E9
| 60590 ||  || — || March 5, 2000 || Socorro || LINEAR || — || align=right | 6.8 km || 
|-id=591 bgcolor=#fefefe
| 60591 ||  || — || March 2, 2000 || Catalina || CSS || — || align=right | 2.3 km || 
|-id=592 bgcolor=#E9E9E9
| 60592 ||  || — || March 4, 2000 || Socorro || LINEAR || WIT || align=right | 2.3 km || 
|-id=593 bgcolor=#fefefe
| 60593 ||  || — || March 4, 2000 || Socorro || LINEAR || FLO || align=right | 1.2 km || 
|-id=594 bgcolor=#E9E9E9
| 60594 ||  || — || March 4, 2000 || Catalina || CSS || — || align=right | 3.5 km || 
|-id=595 bgcolor=#E9E9E9
| 60595 ||  || — || March 5, 2000 || Haleakala || NEAT || EUN || align=right | 4.9 km || 
|-id=596 bgcolor=#fefefe
| 60596 ||  || — || March 5, 2000 || Haleakala || NEAT || NYS || align=right | 1.9 km || 
|-id=597 bgcolor=#E9E9E9
| 60597 ||  || — || March 6, 2000 || Haleakala || NEAT || — || align=right | 6.6 km || 
|-id=598 bgcolor=#E9E9E9
| 60598 ||  || — || March 7, 2000 || Socorro || LINEAR || MAR || align=right | 3.2 km || 
|-id=599 bgcolor=#E9E9E9
| 60599 ||  || — || March 7, 2000 || Socorro || LINEAR || — || align=right | 3.9 km || 
|-id=600 bgcolor=#E9E9E9
| 60600 ||  || — || March 11, 2000 || Catalina || CSS || EUN || align=right | 2.9 km || 
|}

60601–60700 

|-bgcolor=#fefefe
| 60601 ||  || — || March 12, 2000 || Anderson Mesa || LONEOS || — || align=right | 2.6 km || 
|-id=602 bgcolor=#E9E9E9
| 60602 ||  || — || March 3, 2000 || Socorro || LINEAR || MAR || align=right | 2.7 km || 
|-id=603 bgcolor=#fefefe
| 60603 ||  || — || March 3, 2000 || Socorro || LINEAR || — || align=right | 2.0 km || 
|-id=604 bgcolor=#fefefe
| 60604 ||  || — || March 3, 2000 || Socorro || LINEAR || V || align=right | 1.8 km || 
|-id=605 bgcolor=#d6d6d6
| 60605 ||  || — || March 4, 2000 || Socorro || LINEAR || VER || align=right | 8.8 km || 
|-id=606 bgcolor=#E9E9E9
| 60606 ||  || — || March 5, 2000 || Socorro || LINEAR || — || align=right | 5.5 km || 
|-id=607 bgcolor=#fefefe
| 60607 ||  || — || March 9, 2000 || Socorro || LINEAR || — || align=right | 2.6 km || 
|-id=608 bgcolor=#C2E0FF
| 60608 ||  || — || March 3, 2000 || Kitt Peak || J. X. Luu, C. Trujillo, W. Evans || centaurcritical || align=right | 90 km || 
|-id=609 bgcolor=#E9E9E9
| 60609 Kerryprice ||  ||  || March 2, 2000 || Catalina || CSS || — || align=right | 4.1 km || 
|-id=610 bgcolor=#E9E9E9
| 60610 ||  || — || March 4, 2000 || Socorro || LINEAR || — || align=right | 5.4 km || 
|-id=611 bgcolor=#d6d6d6
| 60611 ||  || — || March 5, 2000 || Socorro || LINEAR || — || align=right | 5.1 km || 
|-id=612 bgcolor=#d6d6d6
| 60612 ||  || — || March 3, 2000 || Socorro || LINEAR || EOS || align=right | 3.1 km || 
|-id=613 bgcolor=#E9E9E9
| 60613 ||  || — || March 3, 2000 || Socorro || LINEAR || ADE || align=right | 3.7 km || 
|-id=614 bgcolor=#E9E9E9
| 60614 Tomshea ||  ||  || March 1, 2000 || Catalina || CSS || — || align=right | 3.7 km || 
|-id=615 bgcolor=#E9E9E9
| 60615 ||  || — || March 12, 2000 || Socorro || LINEAR || — || align=right | 3.5 km || 
|-id=616 bgcolor=#d6d6d6
| 60616 ||  || — || March 26, 2000 || Socorro || LINEAR || — || align=right | 11 km || 
|-id=617 bgcolor=#fefefe
| 60617 ||  || — || March 28, 2000 || Socorro || LINEAR || — || align=right | 1.8 km || 
|-id=618 bgcolor=#fefefe
| 60618 ||  || — || March 28, 2000 || Socorro || LINEAR || V || align=right | 1.7 km || 
|-id=619 bgcolor=#E9E9E9
| 60619 ||  || — || March 27, 2000 || Kitt Peak || Spacewatch || — || align=right | 1.7 km || 
|-id=620 bgcolor=#C2E0FF
| 60620 ||  || — || March 27, 2000 || Mauna Kea || J. J. Kavelaars, B. Gladman, J.-M. Petit, M. J. Holman || res4:7critical || align=right | 205 km || 
|-id=621 bgcolor=#C2E0FF
| 60621 ||  || — || March 27, 2000 || Mauna Kea || J. J. Kavelaars, B. Gladman, J.-M. Petit, M. J. Holman || res2:5mooncritical || align=right | 186 km || 
|-id=622 bgcolor=#fefefe
| 60622 Pritchet ||  ||  || March 30, 2000 || NRC-DAO || D. D. Balam || FLO || align=right | 1.2 km || 
|-id=623 bgcolor=#fefefe
| 60623 ||  || — || March 28, 2000 || Socorro || LINEAR || — || align=right | 2.6 km || 
|-id=624 bgcolor=#fefefe
| 60624 ||  || — || March 29, 2000 || Socorro || LINEAR || H || align=right | 1.1 km || 
|-id=625 bgcolor=#E9E9E9
| 60625 ||  || — || March 28, 2000 || Socorro || LINEAR || — || align=right | 5.0 km || 
|-id=626 bgcolor=#fefefe
| 60626 ||  || — || March 29, 2000 || Socorro || LINEAR || — || align=right | 2.7 km || 
|-id=627 bgcolor=#fefefe
| 60627 ||  || — || March 29, 2000 || Socorro || LINEAR || KLI || align=right | 4.3 km || 
|-id=628 bgcolor=#fefefe
| 60628 ||  || — || March 29, 2000 || Socorro || LINEAR || — || align=right | 3.9 km || 
|-id=629 bgcolor=#fefefe
| 60629 ||  || — || March 27, 2000 || Anderson Mesa || LONEOS || V || align=right | 1.4 km || 
|-id=630 bgcolor=#fefefe
| 60630 ||  || — || March 27, 2000 || Anderson Mesa || LONEOS || — || align=right | 2.2 km || 
|-id=631 bgcolor=#E9E9E9
| 60631 ||  || — || March 27, 2000 || Anderson Mesa || LONEOS || — || align=right | 2.8 km || 
|-id=632 bgcolor=#fefefe
| 60632 ||  || — || March 27, 2000 || Anderson Mesa || LONEOS || V || align=right | 1.4 km || 
|-id=633 bgcolor=#fefefe
| 60633 ||  || — || March 27, 2000 || Anderson Mesa || LONEOS || V || align=right | 1.2 km || 
|-id=634 bgcolor=#fefefe
| 60634 ||  || — || March 27, 2000 || Anderson Mesa || LONEOS || V || align=right | 1.5 km || 
|-id=635 bgcolor=#E9E9E9
| 60635 ||  || — || March 27, 2000 || Anderson Mesa || LONEOS || — || align=right | 2.9 km || 
|-id=636 bgcolor=#E9E9E9
| 60636 ||  || — || March 27, 2000 || Anderson Mesa || LONEOS || MAR || align=right | 3.9 km || 
|-id=637 bgcolor=#fefefe
| 60637 ||  || — || March 29, 2000 || Kvistaberg || UDAS || — || align=right | 3.5 km || 
|-id=638 bgcolor=#d6d6d6
| 60638 ||  || — || March 28, 2000 || Socorro || LINEAR || EMA || align=right | 9.4 km || 
|-id=639 bgcolor=#fefefe
| 60639 ||  || — || March 29, 2000 || Socorro || LINEAR || — || align=right | 2.3 km || 
|-id=640 bgcolor=#E9E9E9
| 60640 ||  || — || March 29, 2000 || Socorro || LINEAR || — || align=right | 4.1 km || 
|-id=641 bgcolor=#E9E9E9
| 60641 ||  || — || March 29, 2000 || Socorro || LINEAR || — || align=right | 7.4 km || 
|-id=642 bgcolor=#fefefe
| 60642 ||  || — || March 29, 2000 || Socorro || LINEAR || — || align=right | 5.8 km || 
|-id=643 bgcolor=#fefefe
| 60643 ||  || — || March 29, 2000 || Socorro || LINEAR || — || align=right | 2.1 km || 
|-id=644 bgcolor=#E9E9E9
| 60644 ||  || — || March 29, 2000 || Socorro || LINEAR || GEF || align=right | 3.0 km || 
|-id=645 bgcolor=#fefefe
| 60645 ||  || — || March 29, 2000 || Socorro || LINEAR || NYS || align=right | 2.1 km || 
|-id=646 bgcolor=#d6d6d6
| 60646 ||  || — || March 29, 2000 || Socorro || LINEAR || — || align=right | 3.7 km || 
|-id=647 bgcolor=#fefefe
| 60647 ||  || — || March 29, 2000 || Socorro || LINEAR || — || align=right | 2.1 km || 
|-id=648 bgcolor=#E9E9E9
| 60648 ||  || — || March 29, 2000 || Socorro || LINEAR || AGN || align=right | 3.3 km || 
|-id=649 bgcolor=#E9E9E9
| 60649 ||  || — || March 29, 2000 || Socorro || LINEAR || — || align=right | 2.6 km || 
|-id=650 bgcolor=#E9E9E9
| 60650 ||  || — || March 29, 2000 || Socorro || LINEAR || — || align=right | 4.1 km || 
|-id=651 bgcolor=#fefefe
| 60651 ||  || — || March 28, 2000 || Socorro || LINEAR || NYS || align=right | 1.8 km || 
|-id=652 bgcolor=#fefefe
| 60652 ||  || — || March 29, 2000 || Socorro || LINEAR || NYS || align=right | 1.8 km || 
|-id=653 bgcolor=#fefefe
| 60653 ||  || — || March 29, 2000 || Socorro || LINEAR || — || align=right | 1.8 km || 
|-id=654 bgcolor=#E9E9E9
| 60654 ||  || — || March 29, 2000 || Socorro || LINEAR || RAF || align=right | 3.0 km || 
|-id=655 bgcolor=#E9E9E9
| 60655 ||  || — || March 29, 2000 || Socorro || LINEAR || GEF || align=right | 3.3 km || 
|-id=656 bgcolor=#E9E9E9
| 60656 ||  || — || March 29, 2000 || Socorro || LINEAR || — || align=right | 3.5 km || 
|-id=657 bgcolor=#E9E9E9
| 60657 ||  || — || March 29, 2000 || Socorro || LINEAR || — || align=right | 7.8 km || 
|-id=658 bgcolor=#fefefe
| 60658 ||  || — || March 29, 2000 || Socorro || LINEAR || MAS || align=right | 5.0 km || 
|-id=659 bgcolor=#fefefe
| 60659 ||  || — || March 30, 2000 || Socorro || LINEAR || — || align=right | 1.6 km || 
|-id=660 bgcolor=#fefefe
| 60660 ||  || — || March 27, 2000 || Anderson Mesa || LONEOS || — || align=right | 1.4 km || 
|-id=661 bgcolor=#d6d6d6
| 60661 ||  || — || March 26, 2000 || Anderson Mesa || LONEOS || KOR || align=right | 4.0 km || 
|-id=662 bgcolor=#E9E9E9
| 60662 ||  || — || March 26, 2000 || Anderson Mesa || LONEOS || — || align=right | 1.8 km || 
|-id=663 bgcolor=#fefefe
| 60663 ||  || — || March 29, 2000 || Socorro || LINEAR || — || align=right | 2.1 km || 
|-id=664 bgcolor=#E9E9E9
| 60664 ||  || — || March 26, 2000 || Anderson Mesa || LONEOS || — || align=right | 2.9 km || 
|-id=665 bgcolor=#fefefe
| 60665 ||  || — || March 25, 2000 || Kitt Peak || Spacewatch || NYS || align=right | 2.0 km || 
|-id=666 bgcolor=#fefefe
| 60666 ||  || — || March 26, 2000 || Anderson Mesa || LONEOS || — || align=right | 4.7 km || 
|-id=667 bgcolor=#fefefe
| 60667 ||  || — || April 4, 2000 || Prescott || P. G. Comba || — || align=right | 1.4 km || 
|-id=668 bgcolor=#fefefe
| 60668 ||  || — || April 5, 2000 || Socorro || LINEAR || PHO || align=right | 2.4 km || 
|-id=669 bgcolor=#fefefe
| 60669 Georgpick ||  ||  || April 7, 2000 || Kleť || M. Tichý || — || align=right | 1.9 km || 
|-id=670 bgcolor=#fefefe
| 60670 ||  || — || April 4, 2000 || Socorro || LINEAR || FLO || align=right | 1.9 km || 
|-id=671 bgcolor=#E9E9E9
| 60671 ||  || — || April 5, 2000 || Socorro || LINEAR || — || align=right | 2.8 km || 
|-id=672 bgcolor=#E9E9E9
| 60672 ||  || — || April 5, 2000 || Socorro || LINEAR || — || align=right | 4.1 km || 
|-id=673 bgcolor=#E9E9E9
| 60673 ||  || — || April 5, 2000 || Socorro || LINEAR || — || align=right | 4.6 km || 
|-id=674 bgcolor=#d6d6d6
| 60674 ||  || — || April 5, 2000 || Socorro || LINEAR || — || align=right | 5.7 km || 
|-id=675 bgcolor=#fefefe
| 60675 ||  || — || April 5, 2000 || Socorro || LINEAR || — || align=right | 1.9 km || 
|-id=676 bgcolor=#E9E9E9
| 60676 ||  || — || April 5, 2000 || Socorro || LINEAR || — || align=right | 3.3 km || 
|-id=677 bgcolor=#fefefe
| 60677 ||  || — || April 5, 2000 || Socorro || LINEAR || NYS || align=right | 1.6 km || 
|-id=678 bgcolor=#E9E9E9
| 60678 ||  || — || April 5, 2000 || Socorro || LINEAR || MIS || align=right | 4.8 km || 
|-id=679 bgcolor=#d6d6d6
| 60679 ||  || — || April 5, 2000 || Socorro || LINEAR || KOR || align=right | 3.9 km || 
|-id=680 bgcolor=#E9E9E9
| 60680 ||  || — || April 5, 2000 || Socorro || LINEAR || — || align=right | 2.7 km || 
|-id=681 bgcolor=#fefefe
| 60681 ||  || — || April 5, 2000 || Socorro || LINEAR || FLO || align=right | 2.0 km || 
|-id=682 bgcolor=#d6d6d6
| 60682 ||  || — || April 5, 2000 || Socorro || LINEAR || THM || align=right | 6.2 km || 
|-id=683 bgcolor=#fefefe
| 60683 ||  || — || April 5, 2000 || Socorro || LINEAR || — || align=right | 1.4 km || 
|-id=684 bgcolor=#fefefe
| 60684 ||  || — || April 5, 2000 || Socorro || LINEAR || — || align=right | 1.8 km || 
|-id=685 bgcolor=#fefefe
| 60685 ||  || — || April 5, 2000 || Socorro || LINEAR || — || align=right | 1.4 km || 
|-id=686 bgcolor=#E9E9E9
| 60686 ||  || — || April 5, 2000 || Socorro || LINEAR || MAR || align=right | 3.0 km || 
|-id=687 bgcolor=#E9E9E9
| 60687 ||  || — || April 5, 2000 || Socorro || LINEAR || — || align=right | 3.6 km || 
|-id=688 bgcolor=#d6d6d6
| 60688 ||  || — || April 5, 2000 || Socorro || LINEAR || — || align=right | 6.3 km || 
|-id=689 bgcolor=#FA8072
| 60689 ||  || — || April 5, 2000 || Socorro || LINEAR || — || align=right | 1.9 km || 
|-id=690 bgcolor=#fefefe
| 60690 ||  || — || April 5, 2000 || Socorro || LINEAR || — || align=right | 1.5 km || 
|-id=691 bgcolor=#d6d6d6
| 60691 ||  || — || April 5, 2000 || Socorro || LINEAR || — || align=right | 6.4 km || 
|-id=692 bgcolor=#fefefe
| 60692 ||  || — || April 5, 2000 || Socorro || LINEAR || — || align=right | 2.0 km || 
|-id=693 bgcolor=#d6d6d6
| 60693 ||  || — || April 5, 2000 || Socorro || LINEAR || KOR || align=right | 3.9 km || 
|-id=694 bgcolor=#E9E9E9
| 60694 ||  || — || April 5, 2000 || Socorro || LINEAR || — || align=right | 2.5 km || 
|-id=695 bgcolor=#fefefe
| 60695 ||  || — || April 5, 2000 || Socorro || LINEAR || — || align=right | 2.4 km || 
|-id=696 bgcolor=#E9E9E9
| 60696 ||  || — || April 5, 2000 || Socorro || LINEAR || — || align=right | 5.3 km || 
|-id=697 bgcolor=#fefefe
| 60697 ||  || — || April 5, 2000 || Socorro || LINEAR || — || align=right | 2.1 km || 
|-id=698 bgcolor=#E9E9E9
| 60698 ||  || — || April 5, 2000 || Socorro || LINEAR || — || align=right | 3.9 km || 
|-id=699 bgcolor=#E9E9E9
| 60699 ||  || — || April 5, 2000 || Socorro || LINEAR || — || align=right | 3.0 km || 
|-id=700 bgcolor=#fefefe
| 60700 ||  || — || April 5, 2000 || Socorro || LINEAR || — || align=right | 1.5 km || 
|}

60701–60800 

|-bgcolor=#E9E9E9
| 60701 ||  || — || April 5, 2000 || Socorro || LINEAR || HEN || align=right | 2.4 km || 
|-id=702 bgcolor=#d6d6d6
| 60702 ||  || — || April 5, 2000 || Socorro || LINEAR || — || align=right | 4.4 km || 
|-id=703 bgcolor=#d6d6d6
| 60703 ||  || — || April 5, 2000 || Socorro || LINEAR || — || align=right | 5.8 km || 
|-id=704 bgcolor=#E9E9E9
| 60704 ||  || — || April 5, 2000 || Socorro || LINEAR || — || align=right | 3.4 km || 
|-id=705 bgcolor=#E9E9E9
| 60705 ||  || — || April 5, 2000 || Socorro || LINEAR || — || align=right | 4.7 km || 
|-id=706 bgcolor=#d6d6d6
| 60706 ||  || — || April 5, 2000 || Socorro || LINEAR || — || align=right | 3.2 km || 
|-id=707 bgcolor=#d6d6d6
| 60707 ||  || — || April 5, 2000 || Socorro || LINEAR || — || align=right | 3.3 km || 
|-id=708 bgcolor=#E9E9E9
| 60708 ||  || — || April 5, 2000 || Socorro || LINEAR || HEN || align=right | 2.9 km || 
|-id=709 bgcolor=#fefefe
| 60709 ||  || — || April 5, 2000 || Socorro || LINEAR || V || align=right | 1.6 km || 
|-id=710 bgcolor=#fefefe
| 60710 ||  || — || April 5, 2000 || Socorro || LINEAR || — || align=right | 1.6 km || 
|-id=711 bgcolor=#E9E9E9
| 60711 ||  || — || April 5, 2000 || Socorro || LINEAR || HEN || align=right | 2.9 km || 
|-id=712 bgcolor=#d6d6d6
| 60712 ||  || — || April 5, 2000 || Socorro || LINEAR || — || align=right | 9.5 km || 
|-id=713 bgcolor=#fefefe
| 60713 ||  || — || April 5, 2000 || Socorro || LINEAR || — || align=right | 1.5 km || 
|-id=714 bgcolor=#fefefe
| 60714 ||  || — || April 5, 2000 || Socorro || LINEAR || — || align=right | 1.5 km || 
|-id=715 bgcolor=#fefefe
| 60715 ||  || — || April 5, 2000 || Socorro || LINEAR || NYS || align=right | 3.1 km || 
|-id=716 bgcolor=#fefefe
| 60716 ||  || — || April 5, 2000 || Socorro || LINEAR || fast || align=right | 2.2 km || 
|-id=717 bgcolor=#fefefe
| 60717 ||  || — || April 5, 2000 || Socorro || LINEAR || — || align=right | 1.5 km || 
|-id=718 bgcolor=#fefefe
| 60718 ||  || — || April 5, 2000 || Socorro || LINEAR || — || align=right | 1.8 km || 
|-id=719 bgcolor=#fefefe
| 60719 ||  || — || April 5, 2000 || Socorro || LINEAR || — || align=right | 1.3 km || 
|-id=720 bgcolor=#fefefe
| 60720 ||  || — || April 5, 2000 || Socorro || LINEAR || NYS || align=right | 1.3 km || 
|-id=721 bgcolor=#E9E9E9
| 60721 ||  || — || April 5, 2000 || Socorro || LINEAR || — || align=right | 4.6 km || 
|-id=722 bgcolor=#E9E9E9
| 60722 ||  || — || April 5, 2000 || Socorro || LINEAR || EUN || align=right | 3.1 km || 
|-id=723 bgcolor=#fefefe
| 60723 ||  || — || April 5, 2000 || Socorro || LINEAR || — || align=right | 1.6 km || 
|-id=724 bgcolor=#fefefe
| 60724 ||  || — || April 5, 2000 || Socorro || LINEAR || FLO || align=right | 1.0 km || 
|-id=725 bgcolor=#d6d6d6
| 60725 ||  || — || April 5, 2000 || Socorro || LINEAR || HYG || align=right | 7.5 km || 
|-id=726 bgcolor=#fefefe
| 60726 ||  || — || April 5, 2000 || Socorro || LINEAR || V || align=right | 1.6 km || 
|-id=727 bgcolor=#fefefe
| 60727 ||  || — || April 5, 2000 || Socorro || LINEAR || FLO || align=right | 2.4 km || 
|-id=728 bgcolor=#fefefe
| 60728 ||  || — || April 5, 2000 || Socorro || LINEAR || — || align=right | 1.4 km || 
|-id=729 bgcolor=#fefefe
| 60729 ||  || — || April 5, 2000 || Socorro || LINEAR || — || align=right | 1.7 km || 
|-id=730 bgcolor=#fefefe
| 60730 ||  || — || April 5, 2000 || Socorro || LINEAR || — || align=right | 1.6 km || 
|-id=731 bgcolor=#fefefe
| 60731 ||  || — || April 5, 2000 || Socorro || LINEAR || — || align=right | 1.8 km || 
|-id=732 bgcolor=#d6d6d6
| 60732 ||  || — || April 6, 2000 || Socorro || LINEAR || THM || align=right | 7.4 km || 
|-id=733 bgcolor=#FA8072
| 60733 ||  || — || April 6, 2000 || Socorro || LINEAR || — || align=right | 2.5 km || 
|-id=734 bgcolor=#fefefe
| 60734 ||  || — || April 6, 2000 || Socorro || LINEAR || — || align=right | 1.4 km || 
|-id=735 bgcolor=#FA8072
| 60735 ||  || — || April 7, 2000 || Socorro || LINEAR || — || align=right | 2.7 km || 
|-id=736 bgcolor=#fefefe
| 60736 ||  || — || April 8, 2000 || Višnjan Observatory || K. Korlević || MAS || align=right | 3.6 km || 
|-id=737 bgcolor=#E9E9E9
| 60737 ||  || — || April 4, 2000 || Socorro || LINEAR || — || align=right | 2.6 km || 
|-id=738 bgcolor=#E9E9E9
| 60738 ||  || — || April 4, 2000 || Socorro || LINEAR || — || align=right | 4.4 km || 
|-id=739 bgcolor=#d6d6d6
| 60739 ||  || — || April 4, 2000 || Socorro || LINEAR || EOS || align=right | 3.7 km || 
|-id=740 bgcolor=#E9E9E9
| 60740 ||  || — || April 4, 2000 || Socorro || LINEAR || — || align=right | 3.2 km || 
|-id=741 bgcolor=#E9E9E9
| 60741 ||  || — || April 4, 2000 || Socorro || LINEAR || — || align=right | 4.8 km || 
|-id=742 bgcolor=#E9E9E9
| 60742 ||  || — || April 4, 2000 || Socorro || LINEAR || — || align=right | 13 km || 
|-id=743 bgcolor=#E9E9E9
| 60743 ||  || — || April 5, 2000 || Socorro || LINEAR || — || align=right | 2.8 km || 
|-id=744 bgcolor=#fefefe
| 60744 ||  || — || April 5, 2000 || Socorro || LINEAR || — || align=right | 2.9 km || 
|-id=745 bgcolor=#E9E9E9
| 60745 ||  || — || April 5, 2000 || Socorro || LINEAR || — || align=right | 7.0 km || 
|-id=746 bgcolor=#fefefe
| 60746 ||  || — || April 6, 2000 || Socorro || LINEAR || — || align=right | 2.2 km || 
|-id=747 bgcolor=#fefefe
| 60747 ||  || — || April 6, 2000 || Socorro || LINEAR || FLO || align=right | 1.9 km || 
|-id=748 bgcolor=#E9E9E9
| 60748 ||  || — || April 6, 2000 || Socorro || LINEAR || — || align=right | 4.3 km || 
|-id=749 bgcolor=#fefefe
| 60749 ||  || — || April 6, 2000 || Socorro || LINEAR || — || align=right | 4.7 km || 
|-id=750 bgcolor=#fefefe
| 60750 ||  || — || April 7, 2000 || Socorro || LINEAR || — || align=right | 2.1 km || 
|-id=751 bgcolor=#E9E9E9
| 60751 ||  || — || April 7, 2000 || Socorro || LINEAR || ADE || align=right | 5.7 km || 
|-id=752 bgcolor=#fefefe
| 60752 ||  || — || April 7, 2000 || Socorro || LINEAR || — || align=right | 2.2 km || 
|-id=753 bgcolor=#fefefe
| 60753 ||  || — || April 7, 2000 || Socorro || LINEAR || FLO || align=right | 1.6 km || 
|-id=754 bgcolor=#fefefe
| 60754 ||  || — || April 7, 2000 || Socorro || LINEAR || V || align=right | 1.9 km || 
|-id=755 bgcolor=#d6d6d6
| 60755 ||  || — || April 7, 2000 || Socorro || LINEAR || EOS || align=right | 5.1 km || 
|-id=756 bgcolor=#fefefe
| 60756 ||  || — || April 7, 2000 || Socorro || LINEAR || — || align=right | 1.6 km || 
|-id=757 bgcolor=#fefefe
| 60757 ||  || — || April 7, 2000 || Socorro || LINEAR || — || align=right | 2.5 km || 
|-id=758 bgcolor=#fefefe
| 60758 ||  || — || April 7, 2000 || Socorro || LINEAR || — || align=right | 2.8 km || 
|-id=759 bgcolor=#d6d6d6
| 60759 ||  || — || April 3, 2000 || Anderson Mesa || LONEOS || BRA || align=right | 4.1 km || 
|-id=760 bgcolor=#d6d6d6
| 60760 ||  || — || April 5, 2000 || Socorro || LINEAR || — || align=right | 4.6 km || 
|-id=761 bgcolor=#fefefe
| 60761 ||  || — || April 6, 2000 || Socorro || LINEAR || — || align=right | 2.0 km || 
|-id=762 bgcolor=#fefefe
| 60762 ||  || — || April 8, 2000 || Socorro || LINEAR || NYS || align=right | 2.3 km || 
|-id=763 bgcolor=#fefefe
| 60763 ||  || — || April 3, 2000 || Kitt Peak || Spacewatch || — || align=right | 1.2 km || 
|-id=764 bgcolor=#E9E9E9
| 60764 ||  || — || April 11, 2000 || Fountain Hills || C. W. Juels || — || align=right | 5.0 km || 
|-id=765 bgcolor=#fefefe
| 60765 ||  || — || April 7, 2000 || Socorro || LINEAR || — || align=right | 2.2 km || 
|-id=766 bgcolor=#E9E9E9
| 60766 ||  || — || April 7, 2000 || Socorro || LINEAR || EUN || align=right | 6.4 km || 
|-id=767 bgcolor=#fefefe
| 60767 ||  || — || April 7, 2000 || Socorro || LINEAR || PHO || align=right | 2.5 km || 
|-id=768 bgcolor=#E9E9E9
| 60768 ||  || — || April 12, 2000 || Socorro || LINEAR || GEF || align=right | 3.5 km || 
|-id=769 bgcolor=#fefefe
| 60769 ||  || — || April 7, 2000 || Anderson Mesa || LONEOS || — || align=right | 2.0 km || 
|-id=770 bgcolor=#fefefe
| 60770 ||  || — || April 7, 2000 || Anderson Mesa || LONEOS || — || align=right | 3.6 km || 
|-id=771 bgcolor=#fefefe
| 60771 ||  || — || April 6, 2000 || Anderson Mesa || LONEOS || — || align=right | 2.4 km || 
|-id=772 bgcolor=#E9E9E9
| 60772 ||  || — || April 6, 2000 || Anderson Mesa || LONEOS || — || align=right | 3.7 km || 
|-id=773 bgcolor=#d6d6d6
| 60773 ||  || — || April 7, 2000 || Anderson Mesa || LONEOS || — || align=right | 7.9 km || 
|-id=774 bgcolor=#E9E9E9
| 60774 ||  || — || April 7, 2000 || Socorro || LINEAR || — || align=right | 3.1 km || 
|-id=775 bgcolor=#d6d6d6
| 60775 ||  || — || April 7, 2000 || Socorro || LINEAR || EOS || align=right | 6.3 km || 
|-id=776 bgcolor=#E9E9E9
| 60776 ||  || — || April 7, 2000 || Socorro || LINEAR || — || align=right | 3.3 km || 
|-id=777 bgcolor=#E9E9E9
| 60777 ||  || — || April 8, 2000 || Socorro || LINEAR || ADE || align=right | 7.1 km || 
|-id=778 bgcolor=#fefefe
| 60778 ||  || — || April 8, 2000 || Socorro || LINEAR || NYS || align=right | 1.4 km || 
|-id=779 bgcolor=#E9E9E9
| 60779 ||  || — || April 8, 2000 || Socorro || LINEAR || — || align=right | 3.3 km || 
|-id=780 bgcolor=#fefefe
| 60780 ||  || — || April 12, 2000 || Socorro || LINEAR || V || align=right | 1.9 km || 
|-id=781 bgcolor=#E9E9E9
| 60781 ||  || — || April 12, 2000 || Haleakala || NEAT || EUN || align=right | 2.8 km || 
|-id=782 bgcolor=#E9E9E9
| 60782 ||  || — || April 5, 2000 || Socorro || LINEAR || AST || align=right | 3.0 km || 
|-id=783 bgcolor=#fefefe
| 60783 ||  || — || April 5, 2000 || Anderson Mesa || LONEOS || — || align=right | 1.6 km || 
|-id=784 bgcolor=#fefefe
| 60784 ||  || — || April 2, 2000 || Anderson Mesa || LONEOS || FLO || align=right | 4.7 km || 
|-id=785 bgcolor=#fefefe
| 60785 ||  || — || April 5, 2000 || Anderson Mesa || LONEOS || FLO || align=right | 1.9 km || 
|-id=786 bgcolor=#fefefe
| 60786 ||  || — || April 3, 2000 || Kitt Peak || Spacewatch || V || align=right | 1.6 km || 
|-id=787 bgcolor=#E9E9E9
| 60787 ||  || — || April 14, 2000 || Socorro || LINEAR || MAR || align=right | 2.2 km || 
|-id=788 bgcolor=#fefefe
| 60788 || 2000 HW || — || April 24, 2000 || Kitt Peak || Spacewatch || — || align=right | 1.6 km || 
|-id=789 bgcolor=#fefefe
| 60789 ||  || — || April 25, 2000 || Višnjan Observatory || K. Korlević || V || align=right | 1.6 km || 
|-id=790 bgcolor=#fefefe
| 60790 ||  || — || April 26, 2000 || Kitt Peak || Spacewatch || NYS || align=right | 2.4 km || 
|-id=791 bgcolor=#fefefe
| 60791 ||  || — || April 24, 2000 || Kitt Peak || Spacewatch || NYS || align=right | 3.7 km || 
|-id=792 bgcolor=#d6d6d6
| 60792 ||  || — || April 24, 2000 || Kitt Peak || Spacewatch || THM || align=right | 6.0 km || 
|-id=793 bgcolor=#E9E9E9
| 60793 ||  || — || April 27, 2000 || Socorro || LINEAR || — || align=right | 6.6 km || 
|-id=794 bgcolor=#d6d6d6
| 60794 ||  || — || April 27, 2000 || Socorro || LINEAR || — || align=right | 6.3 km || 
|-id=795 bgcolor=#fefefe
| 60795 ||  || — || April 27, 2000 || Socorro || LINEAR || — || align=right | 2.6 km || 
|-id=796 bgcolor=#fefefe
| 60796 ||  || — || April 27, 2000 || Socorro || LINEAR || — || align=right | 2.2 km || 
|-id=797 bgcolor=#fefefe
| 60797 ||  || — || April 27, 2000 || Socorro || LINEAR || — || align=right | 1.5 km || 
|-id=798 bgcolor=#fefefe
| 60798 ||  || — || April 27, 2000 || Socorro || LINEAR || FLO || align=right | 2.3 km || 
|-id=799 bgcolor=#E9E9E9
| 60799 ||  || — || April 28, 2000 || Socorro || LINEAR || — || align=right | 2.5 km || 
|-id=800 bgcolor=#fefefe
| 60800 ||  || — || April 28, 2000 || Socorro || LINEAR || — || align=right | 2.7 km || 
|}

60801–60900 

|-bgcolor=#fefefe
| 60801 ||  || — || April 27, 2000 || Socorro || LINEAR || — || align=right | 2.8 km || 
|-id=802 bgcolor=#E9E9E9
| 60802 ||  || — || April 27, 2000 || Socorro || LINEAR || — || align=right | 3.4 km || 
|-id=803 bgcolor=#E9E9E9
| 60803 ||  || — || April 24, 2000 || Kitt Peak || Spacewatch || — || align=right | 3.8 km || 
|-id=804 bgcolor=#fefefe
| 60804 ||  || — || April 30, 2000 || Socorro || LINEAR || — || align=right | 1.3 km || 
|-id=805 bgcolor=#fefefe
| 60805 ||  || — || April 26, 2000 || Višnjan Observatory || K. Korlević || — || align=right | 2.2 km || 
|-id=806 bgcolor=#fefefe
| 60806 ||  || — || April 24, 2000 || Anderson Mesa || LONEOS || — || align=right | 2.3 km || 
|-id=807 bgcolor=#E9E9E9
| 60807 ||  || — || April 24, 2000 || Anderson Mesa || LONEOS || — || align=right | 7.5 km || 
|-id=808 bgcolor=#d6d6d6
| 60808 ||  || — || April 24, 2000 || Anderson Mesa || LONEOS || — || align=right | 6.1 km || 
|-id=809 bgcolor=#fefefe
| 60809 ||  || — || April 28, 2000 || Socorro || LINEAR || PHO || align=right | 3.1 km || 
|-id=810 bgcolor=#d6d6d6
| 60810 ||  || — || April 29, 2000 || Socorro || LINEAR || — || align=right | 5.1 km || 
|-id=811 bgcolor=#E9E9E9
| 60811 ||  || — || April 28, 2000 || Socorro || LINEAR || JUN || align=right | 8.7 km || 
|-id=812 bgcolor=#E9E9E9
| 60812 ||  || — || April 28, 2000 || Socorro || LINEAR || — || align=right | 3.2 km || 
|-id=813 bgcolor=#E9E9E9
| 60813 ||  || — || April 29, 2000 || Socorro || LINEAR || — || align=right | 3.5 km || 
|-id=814 bgcolor=#fefefe
| 60814 ||  || — || April 29, 2000 || Socorro || LINEAR || NYS || align=right | 1.4 km || 
|-id=815 bgcolor=#E9E9E9
| 60815 ||  || — || April 29, 2000 || Socorro || LINEAR || HNS || align=right | 4.1 km || 
|-id=816 bgcolor=#fefefe
| 60816 ||  || — || April 25, 2000 || Anderson Mesa || LONEOS || — || align=right | 1.8 km || 
|-id=817 bgcolor=#E9E9E9
| 60817 ||  || — || April 29, 2000 || Socorro || LINEAR || HNS || align=right | 3.2 km || 
|-id=818 bgcolor=#E9E9E9
| 60818 ||  || — || April 28, 2000 || Kitt Peak || Spacewatch || — || align=right | 2.4 km || 
|-id=819 bgcolor=#E9E9E9
| 60819 ||  || — || April 28, 2000 || Kitt Peak || Spacewatch || HOF || align=right | 6.3 km || 
|-id=820 bgcolor=#fefefe
| 60820 ||  || — || April 30, 2000 || Kitt Peak || Spacewatch || — || align=right | 1.3 km || 
|-id=821 bgcolor=#E9E9E9
| 60821 ||  || — || April 30, 2000 || Kitt Peak || Spacewatch || — || align=right | 2.3 km || 
|-id=822 bgcolor=#d6d6d6
| 60822 ||  || — || April 29, 2000 || Socorro || LINEAR || HYG || align=right | 5.8 km || 
|-id=823 bgcolor=#E9E9E9
| 60823 ||  || — || April 29, 2000 || Socorro || LINEAR || — || align=right | 3.3 km || 
|-id=824 bgcolor=#fefefe
| 60824 ||  || — || April 29, 2000 || Socorro || LINEAR || — || align=right | 1.8 km || 
|-id=825 bgcolor=#fefefe
| 60825 ||  || — || April 26, 2000 || Anderson Mesa || LONEOS || — || align=right | 1.9 km || 
|-id=826 bgcolor=#fefefe
| 60826 ||  || — || April 29, 2000 || Socorro || LINEAR || FLO || align=right data-sort-value="0.94" | 940 m || 
|-id=827 bgcolor=#E9E9E9
| 60827 ||  || — || April 29, 2000 || Socorro || LINEAR || — || align=right | 4.2 km || 
|-id=828 bgcolor=#fefefe
| 60828 ||  || — || April 29, 2000 || Socorro || LINEAR || — || align=right | 1.3 km || 
|-id=829 bgcolor=#fefefe
| 60829 ||  || — || April 29, 2000 || Socorro || LINEAR || NYS || align=right | 1.3 km || 
|-id=830 bgcolor=#fefefe
| 60830 ||  || — || April 29, 2000 || Socorro || LINEAR || — || align=right | 1.4 km || 
|-id=831 bgcolor=#E9E9E9
| 60831 ||  || — || April 29, 2000 || Socorro || LINEAR || — || align=right | 5.4 km || 
|-id=832 bgcolor=#fefefe
| 60832 ||  || — || April 29, 2000 || Socorro || LINEAR || — || align=right | 1.9 km || 
|-id=833 bgcolor=#E9E9E9
| 60833 ||  || — || April 29, 2000 || Socorro || LINEAR || GEF || align=right | 2.8 km || 
|-id=834 bgcolor=#fefefe
| 60834 ||  || — || April 29, 2000 || Socorro || LINEAR || — || align=right | 1.3 km || 
|-id=835 bgcolor=#fefefe
| 60835 ||  || — || April 29, 2000 || Socorro || LINEAR || MAS || align=right | 2.0 km || 
|-id=836 bgcolor=#d6d6d6
| 60836 ||  || — || April 29, 2000 || Socorro || LINEAR || — || align=right | 8.2 km || 
|-id=837 bgcolor=#fefefe
| 60837 ||  || — || April 29, 2000 || Socorro || LINEAR || — || align=right | 1.9 km || 
|-id=838 bgcolor=#d6d6d6
| 60838 ||  || — || April 29, 2000 || Socorro || LINEAR || THM || align=right | 7.2 km || 
|-id=839 bgcolor=#fefefe
| 60839 ||  || — || April 24, 2000 || Anderson Mesa || LONEOS || — || align=right | 2.3 km || 
|-id=840 bgcolor=#fefefe
| 60840 ||  || — || April 24, 2000 || Anderson Mesa || LONEOS || — || align=right | 1.7 km || 
|-id=841 bgcolor=#E9E9E9
| 60841 ||  || — || April 24, 2000 || Anderson Mesa || LONEOS || — || align=right | 7.3 km || 
|-id=842 bgcolor=#fefefe
| 60842 ||  || — || April 25, 2000 || Anderson Mesa || LONEOS || — || align=right | 2.3 km || 
|-id=843 bgcolor=#fefefe
| 60843 ||  || — || April 25, 2000 || Anderson Mesa || LONEOS || — || align=right | 2.0 km || 
|-id=844 bgcolor=#fefefe
| 60844 ||  || — || April 25, 2000 || Kitt Peak || Spacewatch || — || align=right data-sort-value="0.99" | 990 m || 
|-id=845 bgcolor=#fefefe
| 60845 ||  || — || April 25, 2000 || Kitt Peak || Spacewatch || FLO || align=right | 2.2 km || 
|-id=846 bgcolor=#fefefe
| 60846 ||  || — || April 26, 2000 || Anderson Mesa || LONEOS || — || align=right | 2.3 km || 
|-id=847 bgcolor=#fefefe
| 60847 ||  || — || April 26, 2000 || Anderson Mesa || LONEOS || — || align=right | 2.2 km || 
|-id=848 bgcolor=#E9E9E9
| 60848 ||  || — || April 26, 2000 || Anderson Mesa || LONEOS || — || align=right | 2.6 km || 
|-id=849 bgcolor=#fefefe
| 60849 ||  || — || April 26, 2000 || Anderson Mesa || LONEOS || — || align=right | 1.3 km || 
|-id=850 bgcolor=#E9E9E9
| 60850 ||  || — || April 26, 2000 || Anderson Mesa || LONEOS || — || align=right | 3.5 km || 
|-id=851 bgcolor=#fefefe
| 60851 ||  || — || April 26, 2000 || Anderson Mesa || LONEOS || FLO || align=right | 2.7 km || 
|-id=852 bgcolor=#fefefe
| 60852 ||  || — || April 26, 2000 || Anderson Mesa || LONEOS || SUL || align=right | 4.9 km || 
|-id=853 bgcolor=#fefefe
| 60853 ||  || — || April 26, 2000 || Anderson Mesa || LONEOS || — || align=right | 1.6 km || 
|-id=854 bgcolor=#E9E9E9
| 60854 ||  || — || April 26, 2000 || Anderson Mesa || LONEOS || — || align=right | 4.1 km || 
|-id=855 bgcolor=#fefefe
| 60855 ||  || — || April 26, 2000 || Kitt Peak || Spacewatch || — || align=right | 1.7 km || 
|-id=856 bgcolor=#fefefe
| 60856 ||  || — || April 27, 2000 || Socorro || LINEAR || V || align=right | 1.6 km || 
|-id=857 bgcolor=#E9E9E9
| 60857 ||  || — || April 27, 2000 || Anderson Mesa || LONEOS || EUN || align=right | 2.6 km || 
|-id=858 bgcolor=#fefefe
| 60858 ||  || — || April 27, 2000 || Anderson Mesa || LONEOS || — || align=right | 5.5 km || 
|-id=859 bgcolor=#fefefe
| 60859 ||  || — || April 27, 2000 || Socorro || LINEAR || — || align=right | 1.8 km || 
|-id=860 bgcolor=#fefefe
| 60860 ||  || — || April 26, 2000 || Anderson Mesa || LONEOS || V || align=right data-sort-value="0.97" | 970 m || 
|-id=861 bgcolor=#E9E9E9
| 60861 ||  || — || April 27, 2000 || Anderson Mesa || LONEOS || — || align=right | 3.0 km || 
|-id=862 bgcolor=#fefefe
| 60862 ||  || — || April 30, 2000 || Kitt Peak || Spacewatch || — || align=right | 2.0 km || 
|-id=863 bgcolor=#E9E9E9
| 60863 ||  || — || April 27, 2000 || Socorro || LINEAR || — || align=right | 2.5 km || 
|-id=864 bgcolor=#d6d6d6
| 60864 ||  || — || April 27, 2000 || Socorro || LINEAR || — || align=right | 11 km || 
|-id=865 bgcolor=#fefefe
| 60865 ||  || — || April 27, 2000 || Socorro || LINEAR || NYS || align=right | 1.3 km || 
|-id=866 bgcolor=#E9E9E9
| 60866 ||  || — || April 28, 2000 || Socorro || LINEAR || — || align=right | 2.6 km || 
|-id=867 bgcolor=#fefefe
| 60867 ||  || — || April 28, 2000 || Socorro || LINEAR || — || align=right | 2.7 km || 
|-id=868 bgcolor=#fefefe
| 60868 ||  || — || April 28, 2000 || Anderson Mesa || LONEOS || PHO || align=right | 4.0 km || 
|-id=869 bgcolor=#d6d6d6
| 60869 ||  || — || April 29, 2000 || Socorro || LINEAR || — || align=right | 5.8 km || 
|-id=870 bgcolor=#fefefe
| 60870 ||  || — || April 29, 2000 || Socorro || LINEAR || — || align=right | 1.6 km || 
|-id=871 bgcolor=#fefefe
| 60871 ||  || — || April 29, 2000 || Socorro || LINEAR || — || align=right | 1.8 km || 
|-id=872 bgcolor=#E9E9E9
| 60872 ||  || — || April 30, 2000 || Anderson Mesa || LONEOS || DOR || align=right | 7.1 km || 
|-id=873 bgcolor=#fefefe
| 60873 ||  || — || April 30, 2000 || Anderson Mesa || LONEOS || — || align=right | 2.4 km || 
|-id=874 bgcolor=#E9E9E9
| 60874 ||  || — || April 30, 2000 || Anderson Mesa || LONEOS || — || align=right | 5.0 km || 
|-id=875 bgcolor=#fefefe
| 60875 ||  || — || April 30, 2000 || Anderson Mesa || LONEOS || — || align=right | 1.7 km || 
|-id=876 bgcolor=#d6d6d6
| 60876 ||  || — || April 27, 2000 || Socorro || LINEAR || — || align=right | 10 km || 
|-id=877 bgcolor=#fefefe
| 60877 ||  || — || April 29, 2000 || Socorro || LINEAR || MAS || align=right | 1.6 km || 
|-id=878 bgcolor=#fefefe
| 60878 ||  || — || April 29, 2000 || Socorro || LINEAR || — || align=right | 1.8 km || 
|-id=879 bgcolor=#E9E9E9
| 60879 ||  || — || April 29, 2000 || Socorro || LINEAR || — || align=right | 2.6 km || 
|-id=880 bgcolor=#E9E9E9
| 60880 ||  || — || April 29, 2000 || Socorro || LINEAR || — || align=right | 2.4 km || 
|-id=881 bgcolor=#fefefe
| 60881 ||  || — || April 29, 2000 || Socorro || LINEAR || — || align=right | 1.5 km || 
|-id=882 bgcolor=#fefefe
| 60882 ||  || — || April 28, 2000 || Socorro || LINEAR || FLO || align=right | 1.5 km || 
|-id=883 bgcolor=#E9E9E9
| 60883 ||  || — || April 26, 2000 || Anderson Mesa || LONEOS || — || align=right | 3.2 km || 
|-id=884 bgcolor=#fefefe
| 60884 ||  || — || May 3, 2000 || Socorro || LINEAR || — || align=right | 1.8 km || 
|-id=885 bgcolor=#d6d6d6
| 60885 ||  || — || May 4, 2000 || Socorro || LINEAR || — || align=right | 7.6 km || 
|-id=886 bgcolor=#FA8072
| 60886 ||  || — || May 6, 2000 || Socorro || LINEAR || — || align=right | 1.6 km || 
|-id=887 bgcolor=#fefefe
| 60887 ||  || — || May 6, 2000 || Socorro || LINEAR || FLO || align=right | 1.4 km || 
|-id=888 bgcolor=#fefefe
| 60888 ||  || — || May 9, 2000 || Socorro || LINEAR || — || align=right | 2.7 km || 
|-id=889 bgcolor=#fefefe
| 60889 ||  || — || May 6, 2000 || Socorro || LINEAR || — || align=right | 1.8 km || 
|-id=890 bgcolor=#fefefe
| 60890 ||  || — || May 5, 2000 || Socorro || LINEAR || — || align=right | 1.3 km || 
|-id=891 bgcolor=#fefefe
| 60891 ||  || — || May 3, 2000 || Socorro || LINEAR || FLO || align=right | 1.6 km || 
|-id=892 bgcolor=#E9E9E9
| 60892 ||  || — || May 4, 2000 || Socorro || LINEAR || MAR || align=right | 4.1 km || 
|-id=893 bgcolor=#E9E9E9
| 60893 ||  || — || May 6, 2000 || Socorro || LINEAR || — || align=right | 3.1 km || 
|-id=894 bgcolor=#fefefe
| 60894 ||  || — || May 6, 2000 || Socorro || LINEAR || — || align=right | 1.9 km || 
|-id=895 bgcolor=#fefefe
| 60895 ||  || — || May 6, 2000 || Socorro || LINEAR || FLO || align=right | 1.4 km || 
|-id=896 bgcolor=#E9E9E9
| 60896 ||  || — || May 7, 2000 || Socorro || LINEAR || ADE || align=right | 7.5 km || 
|-id=897 bgcolor=#fefefe
| 60897 ||  || — || May 7, 2000 || Socorro || LINEAR || — || align=right | 1.8 km || 
|-id=898 bgcolor=#fefefe
| 60898 ||  || — || May 7, 2000 || Socorro || LINEAR || — || align=right | 1.8 km || 
|-id=899 bgcolor=#fefefe
| 60899 ||  || — || May 7, 2000 || Socorro || LINEAR || V || align=right | 2.1 km || 
|-id=900 bgcolor=#fefefe
| 60900 ||  || — || May 7, 2000 || Socorro || LINEAR || ERI || align=right | 5.0 km || 
|}

60901–61000 

|-bgcolor=#fefefe
| 60901 ||  || — || May 7, 2000 || Socorro || LINEAR || — || align=right | 2.0 km || 
|-id=902 bgcolor=#d6d6d6
| 60902 ||  || — || May 7, 2000 || Socorro || LINEAR || HYG || align=right | 7.2 km || 
|-id=903 bgcolor=#E9E9E9
| 60903 ||  || — || May 7, 2000 || Socorro || LINEAR || — || align=right | 2.9 km || 
|-id=904 bgcolor=#fefefe
| 60904 ||  || — || May 7, 2000 || Socorro || LINEAR || — || align=right | 1.5 km || 
|-id=905 bgcolor=#fefefe
| 60905 ||  || — || May 7, 2000 || Socorro || LINEAR || — || align=right | 1.8 km || 
|-id=906 bgcolor=#fefefe
| 60906 ||  || — || May 7, 2000 || Socorro || LINEAR || — || align=right | 4.0 km || 
|-id=907 bgcolor=#fefefe
| 60907 ||  || — || May 7, 2000 || Socorro || LINEAR || — || align=right | 2.2 km || 
|-id=908 bgcolor=#fefefe
| 60908 ||  || — || May 7, 2000 || Socorro || LINEAR || NYS || align=right | 4.2 km || 
|-id=909 bgcolor=#fefefe
| 60909 ||  || — || May 7, 2000 || Socorro || LINEAR || V || align=right | 1.9 km || 
|-id=910 bgcolor=#fefefe
| 60910 ||  || — || May 7, 2000 || Socorro || LINEAR || NYS || align=right | 1.4 km || 
|-id=911 bgcolor=#fefefe
| 60911 ||  || — || May 7, 2000 || Socorro || LINEAR || — || align=right | 1.9 km || 
|-id=912 bgcolor=#fefefe
| 60912 ||  || — || May 7, 2000 || Socorro || LINEAR || — || align=right | 2.2 km || 
|-id=913 bgcolor=#E9E9E9
| 60913 ||  || — || May 7, 2000 || Socorro || LINEAR || — || align=right | 2.9 km || 
|-id=914 bgcolor=#E9E9E9
| 60914 ||  || — || May 7, 2000 || Socorro || LINEAR || — || align=right | 2.0 km || 
|-id=915 bgcolor=#fefefe
| 60915 ||  || — || May 7, 2000 || Socorro || LINEAR || — || align=right | 2.2 km || 
|-id=916 bgcolor=#fefefe
| 60916 ||  || — || May 7, 2000 || Socorro || LINEAR || — || align=right | 3.0 km || 
|-id=917 bgcolor=#fefefe
| 60917 ||  || — || May 7, 2000 || Socorro || LINEAR || — || align=right | 1.3 km || 
|-id=918 bgcolor=#fefefe
| 60918 ||  || — || May 7, 2000 || Socorro || LINEAR || — || align=right | 1.4 km || 
|-id=919 bgcolor=#E9E9E9
| 60919 ||  || — || May 7, 2000 || Socorro || LINEAR || — || align=right | 2.2 km || 
|-id=920 bgcolor=#fefefe
| 60920 ||  || — || May 6, 2000 || Socorro || LINEAR || — || align=right | 2.7 km || 
|-id=921 bgcolor=#fefefe
| 60921 ||  || — || May 6, 2000 || Socorro || LINEAR || FLO || align=right | 1.7 km || 
|-id=922 bgcolor=#fefefe
| 60922 ||  || — || May 6, 2000 || Socorro || LINEAR || NYS || align=right | 2.1 km || 
|-id=923 bgcolor=#fefefe
| 60923 ||  || — || May 7, 2000 || Socorro || LINEAR || NYS || align=right | 4.6 km || 
|-id=924 bgcolor=#FA8072
| 60924 ||  || — || May 7, 2000 || Socorro || LINEAR || — || align=right | 1.8 km || 
|-id=925 bgcolor=#E9E9E9
| 60925 ||  || — || May 7, 2000 || Socorro || LINEAR || — || align=right | 3.2 km || 
|-id=926 bgcolor=#d6d6d6
| 60926 ||  || — || May 7, 2000 || Socorro || LINEAR || HYG || align=right | 10 km || 
|-id=927 bgcolor=#d6d6d6
| 60927 ||  || — || May 7, 2000 || Socorro || LINEAR || — || align=right | 6.7 km || 
|-id=928 bgcolor=#fefefe
| 60928 ||  || — || May 7, 2000 || Socorro || LINEAR || — || align=right | 1.7 km || 
|-id=929 bgcolor=#fefefe
| 60929 ||  || — || May 7, 2000 || Socorro || LINEAR || — || align=right | 2.7 km || 
|-id=930 bgcolor=#E9E9E9
| 60930 ||  || — || May 9, 2000 || Socorro || LINEAR || — || align=right | 7.0 km || 
|-id=931 bgcolor=#E9E9E9
| 60931 ||  || — || May 9, 2000 || Socorro || LINEAR || — || align=right | 3.0 km || 
|-id=932 bgcolor=#E9E9E9
| 60932 ||  || — || May 9, 2000 || Socorro || LINEAR || — || align=right | 3.1 km || 
|-id=933 bgcolor=#fefefe
| 60933 ||  || — || May 9, 2000 || Socorro || LINEAR || — || align=right | 2.3 km || 
|-id=934 bgcolor=#d6d6d6
| 60934 ||  || — || May 9, 2000 || Socorro || LINEAR || 7:4 || align=right | 7.3 km || 
|-id=935 bgcolor=#fefefe
| 60935 ||  || — || May 9, 2000 || Socorro || LINEAR || FLO || align=right | 1.8 km || 
|-id=936 bgcolor=#fefefe
| 60936 ||  || — || May 9, 2000 || Socorro || LINEAR || — || align=right | 3.0 km || 
|-id=937 bgcolor=#E9E9E9
| 60937 ||  || — || May 9, 2000 || Socorro || LINEAR || — || align=right | 5.3 km || 
|-id=938 bgcolor=#fefefe
| 60938 ||  || — || May 6, 2000 || Socorro || LINEAR || — || align=right | 1.4 km || 
|-id=939 bgcolor=#fefefe
| 60939 ||  || — || May 6, 2000 || Socorro || LINEAR || NYS || align=right | 1.6 km || 
|-id=940 bgcolor=#fefefe
| 60940 ||  || — || May 6, 2000 || Socorro || LINEAR || FLO || align=right | 1.6 km || 
|-id=941 bgcolor=#fefefe
| 60941 ||  || — || May 6, 2000 || Socorro || LINEAR || V || align=right | 1.7 km || 
|-id=942 bgcolor=#fefefe
| 60942 ||  || — || May 6, 2000 || Socorro || LINEAR || — || align=right | 2.3 km || 
|-id=943 bgcolor=#fefefe
| 60943 ||  || — || May 6, 2000 || Socorro || LINEAR || — || align=right | 2.7 km || 
|-id=944 bgcolor=#fefefe
| 60944 ||  || — || May 6, 2000 || Socorro || LINEAR || — || align=right | 3.0 km || 
|-id=945 bgcolor=#fefefe
| 60945 ||  || — || May 6, 2000 || Socorro || LINEAR || — || align=right | 1.9 km || 
|-id=946 bgcolor=#E9E9E9
| 60946 ||  || — || May 6, 2000 || Socorro || LINEAR || — || align=right | 2.5 km || 
|-id=947 bgcolor=#E9E9E9
| 60947 ||  || — || May 6, 2000 || Socorro || LINEAR || — || align=right | 4.8 km || 
|-id=948 bgcolor=#fefefe
| 60948 ||  || — || May 7, 2000 || Socorro || LINEAR || — || align=right | 5.0 km || 
|-id=949 bgcolor=#fefefe
| 60949 ||  || — || May 7, 2000 || Socorro || LINEAR || slow? || align=right | 2.0 km || 
|-id=950 bgcolor=#fefefe
| 60950 ||  || — || May 7, 2000 || Socorro || LINEAR || — || align=right | 2.9 km || 
|-id=951 bgcolor=#fefefe
| 60951 ||  || — || May 7, 2000 || Socorro || LINEAR || — || align=right | 4.1 km || 
|-id=952 bgcolor=#E9E9E9
| 60952 ||  || — || May 9, 2000 || Socorro || LINEAR || — || align=right | 3.8 km || 
|-id=953 bgcolor=#d6d6d6
| 60953 ||  || — || May 9, 2000 || Socorro || LINEAR || — || align=right | 11 km || 
|-id=954 bgcolor=#fefefe
| 60954 ||  || — || May 9, 2000 || Socorro || LINEAR || NYS || align=right | 2.1 km || 
|-id=955 bgcolor=#fefefe
| 60955 ||  || — || May 5, 2000 || Socorro || LINEAR || — || align=right | 1.7 km || 
|-id=956 bgcolor=#fefefe
| 60956 ||  || — || May 2, 2000 || Socorro || LINEAR || PHO || align=right | 2.4 km || 
|-id=957 bgcolor=#E9E9E9
| 60957 ||  || — || May 1, 2000 || Anderson Mesa || LONEOS || — || align=right | 2.9 km || 
|-id=958 bgcolor=#fefefe
| 60958 ||  || — || May 1, 2000 || Kitt Peak || Spacewatch || — || align=right | 1.2 km || 
|-id=959 bgcolor=#fefefe
| 60959 ||  || — || May 2, 2000 || Anderson Mesa || LONEOS || — || align=right | 2.4 km || 
|-id=960 bgcolor=#fefefe
| 60960 ||  || — || May 3, 2000 || Kitt Peak || Spacewatch || — || align=right | 2.8 km || 
|-id=961 bgcolor=#fefefe
| 60961 ||  || — || May 4, 2000 || Kitt Peak || Spacewatch || — || align=right | 2.4 km || 
|-id=962 bgcolor=#fefefe
| 60962 ||  || — || May 6, 2000 || Socorro || LINEAR || — || align=right | 1.3 km || 
|-id=963 bgcolor=#fefefe
| 60963 ||  || — || May 6, 2000 || Socorro || LINEAR || NYS || align=right | 1.9 km || 
|-id=964 bgcolor=#E9E9E9
| 60964 ||  || — || May 7, 2000 || Socorro || LINEAR || — || align=right | 2.4 km || 
|-id=965 bgcolor=#fefefe
| 60965 ||  || — || May 7, 2000 || Socorro || LINEAR || — || align=right | 1.9 km || 
|-id=966 bgcolor=#fefefe
| 60966 ||  || — || May 6, 2000 || Kitt Peak || Spacewatch || — || align=right | 1.4 km || 
|-id=967 bgcolor=#fefefe
| 60967 ||  || — || May 6, 2000 || Kitt Peak || Spacewatch || — || align=right | 1.8 km || 
|-id=968 bgcolor=#fefefe
| 60968 ||  || — || May 7, 2000 || Socorro || LINEAR || — || align=right | 1.6 km || 
|-id=969 bgcolor=#fefefe
| 60969 ||  || — || May 6, 2000 || Socorro || LINEAR || MAS || align=right | 1.4 km || 
|-id=970 bgcolor=#E9E9E9
| 60970 ||  || — || May 5, 2000 || Socorro || LINEAR || HEN || align=right | 2.5 km || 
|-id=971 bgcolor=#fefefe
| 60971 ||  || — || May 3, 2000 || Kitt Peak || Spacewatch || FLO || align=right | 1.3 km || 
|-id=972 bgcolor=#E9E9E9
| 60972 Matenko || 2000 KN ||  || May 23, 2000 || Modra || A. Galád, P. Kolény || EUN || align=right | 3.3 km || 
|-id=973 bgcolor=#fefefe
| 60973 ||  || — || May 26, 2000 || Socorro || LINEAR || PHO || align=right | 3.6 km || 
|-id=974 bgcolor=#fefefe
| 60974 ||  || — || May 25, 2000 || Kitt Peak || Spacewatch || FLO || align=right | 2.7 km || 
|-id=975 bgcolor=#E9E9E9
| 60975 ||  || — || May 27, 2000 || Socorro || LINEAR || MAR || align=right | 3.0 km || 
|-id=976 bgcolor=#fefefe
| 60976 ||  || — || May 27, 2000 || Socorro || LINEAR || — || align=right | 2.6 km || 
|-id=977 bgcolor=#fefefe
| 60977 ||  || — || May 27, 2000 || Socorro || LINEAR || — || align=right | 1.4 km || 
|-id=978 bgcolor=#E9E9E9
| 60978 ||  || — || May 27, 2000 || Socorro || LINEAR || JUN || align=right | 6.7 km || 
|-id=979 bgcolor=#fefefe
| 60979 ||  || — || May 27, 2000 || Socorro || LINEAR || V || align=right | 2.3 km || 
|-id=980 bgcolor=#fefefe
| 60980 ||  || — || May 28, 2000 || Socorro || LINEAR || NYS || align=right | 4.7 km || 
|-id=981 bgcolor=#fefefe
| 60981 ||  || — || May 28, 2000 || Socorro || LINEAR || — || align=right | 1.9 km || 
|-id=982 bgcolor=#fefefe
| 60982 ||  || — || May 28, 2000 || Socorro || LINEAR || FLO || align=right | 1.5 km || 
|-id=983 bgcolor=#fefefe
| 60983 ||  || — || May 28, 2000 || Socorro || LINEAR || FLO || align=right | 1.8 km || 
|-id=984 bgcolor=#d6d6d6
| 60984 ||  || — || May 28, 2000 || Socorro || LINEAR || — || align=right | 5.3 km || 
|-id=985 bgcolor=#d6d6d6
| 60985 ||  || — || May 28, 2000 || Socorro || LINEAR || HYG || align=right | 6.5 km || 
|-id=986 bgcolor=#E9E9E9
| 60986 ||  || — || May 28, 2000 || Socorro || LINEAR || — || align=right | 2.7 km || 
|-id=987 bgcolor=#d6d6d6
| 60987 ||  || — || May 28, 2000 || Socorro || LINEAR || VER || align=right | 6.7 km || 
|-id=988 bgcolor=#fefefe
| 60988 ||  || — || May 28, 2000 || Socorro || LINEAR || — || align=right | 2.0 km || 
|-id=989 bgcolor=#fefefe
| 60989 ||  || — || May 28, 2000 || Socorro || LINEAR || — || align=right | 1.6 km || 
|-id=990 bgcolor=#fefefe
| 60990 ||  || — || May 28, 2000 || Socorro || LINEAR || — || align=right | 3.8 km || 
|-id=991 bgcolor=#fefefe
| 60991 ||  || — || May 28, 2000 || Socorro || LINEAR || FLO || align=right | 2.2 km || 
|-id=992 bgcolor=#fefefe
| 60992 ||  || — || May 28, 2000 || Socorro || LINEAR || V || align=right | 1.7 km || 
|-id=993 bgcolor=#fefefe
| 60993 ||  || — || May 28, 2000 || Socorro || LINEAR || — || align=right | 2.0 km || 
|-id=994 bgcolor=#fefefe
| 60994 ||  || — || May 28, 2000 || Socorro || LINEAR || — || align=right | 1.7 km || 
|-id=995 bgcolor=#fefefe
| 60995 ||  || — || May 28, 2000 || Socorro || LINEAR || — || align=right | 1.4 km || 
|-id=996 bgcolor=#fefefe
| 60996 ||  || — || May 28, 2000 || Socorro || LINEAR || — || align=right | 1.8 km || 
|-id=997 bgcolor=#fefefe
| 60997 ||  || — || May 28, 2000 || Socorro || LINEAR || FLO || align=right | 1.9 km || 
|-id=998 bgcolor=#fefefe
| 60998 ||  || — || May 28, 2000 || Socorro || LINEAR || — || align=right | 2.0 km || 
|-id=999 bgcolor=#fefefe
| 60999 ||  || — || May 28, 2000 || Socorro || LINEAR || FLO || align=right | 1.3 km || 
|-id=000 bgcolor=#E9E9E9
| 61000 ||  || — || May 28, 2000 || Socorro || LINEAR || — || align=right | 2.7 km || 
|}

References

External links 
 Discovery Circumstances: Numbered Minor Planets (60001)–(65000) (IAU Minor Planet Center)

0060